= Etruscan art =

Art of the ancient Etruscan civilization

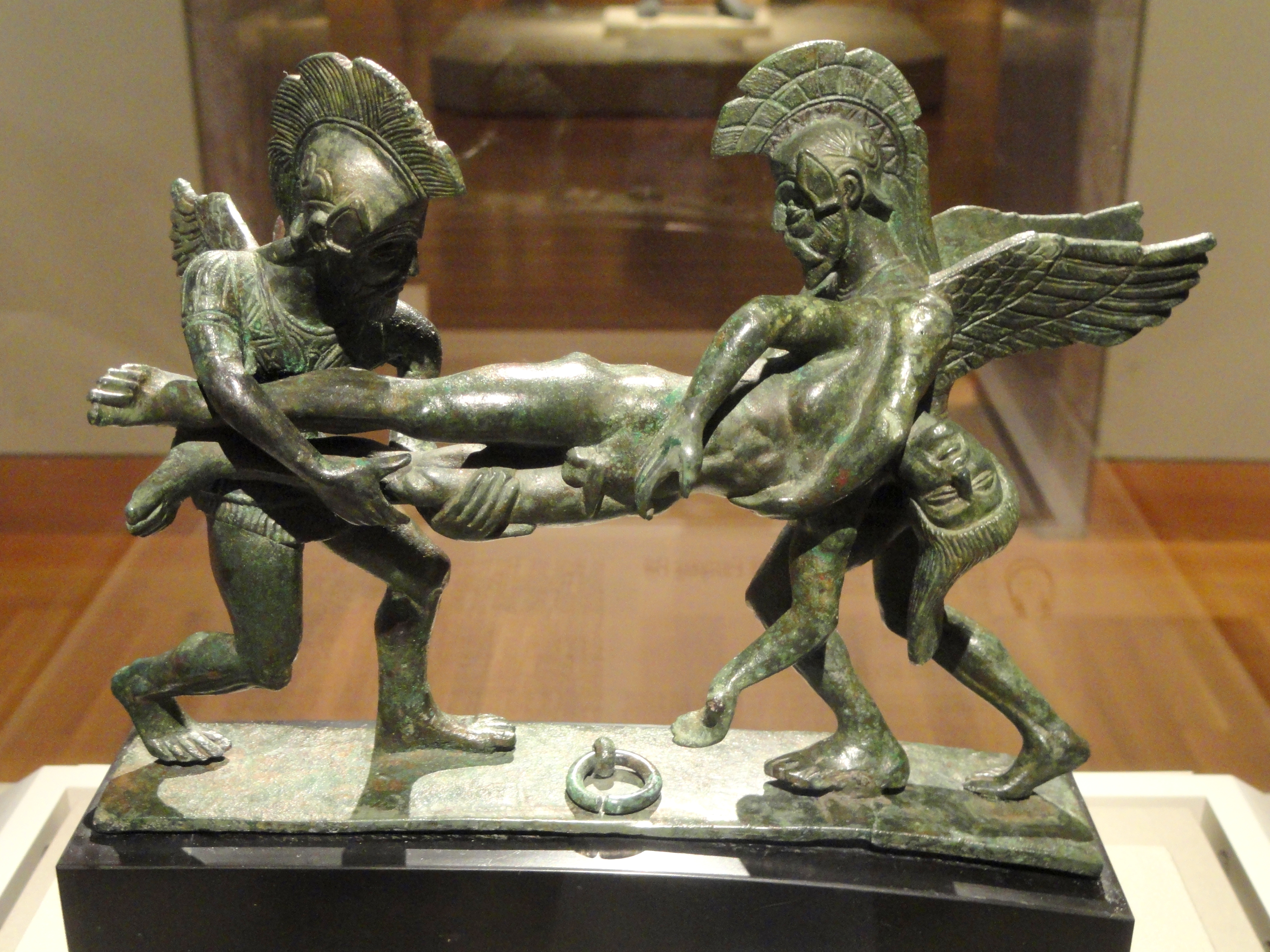
Bronze cista handle with Sleep and Death Carrying off the Slain Sarpedon, 400–380 BC, Cleveland Museum of Art, Cleveland.

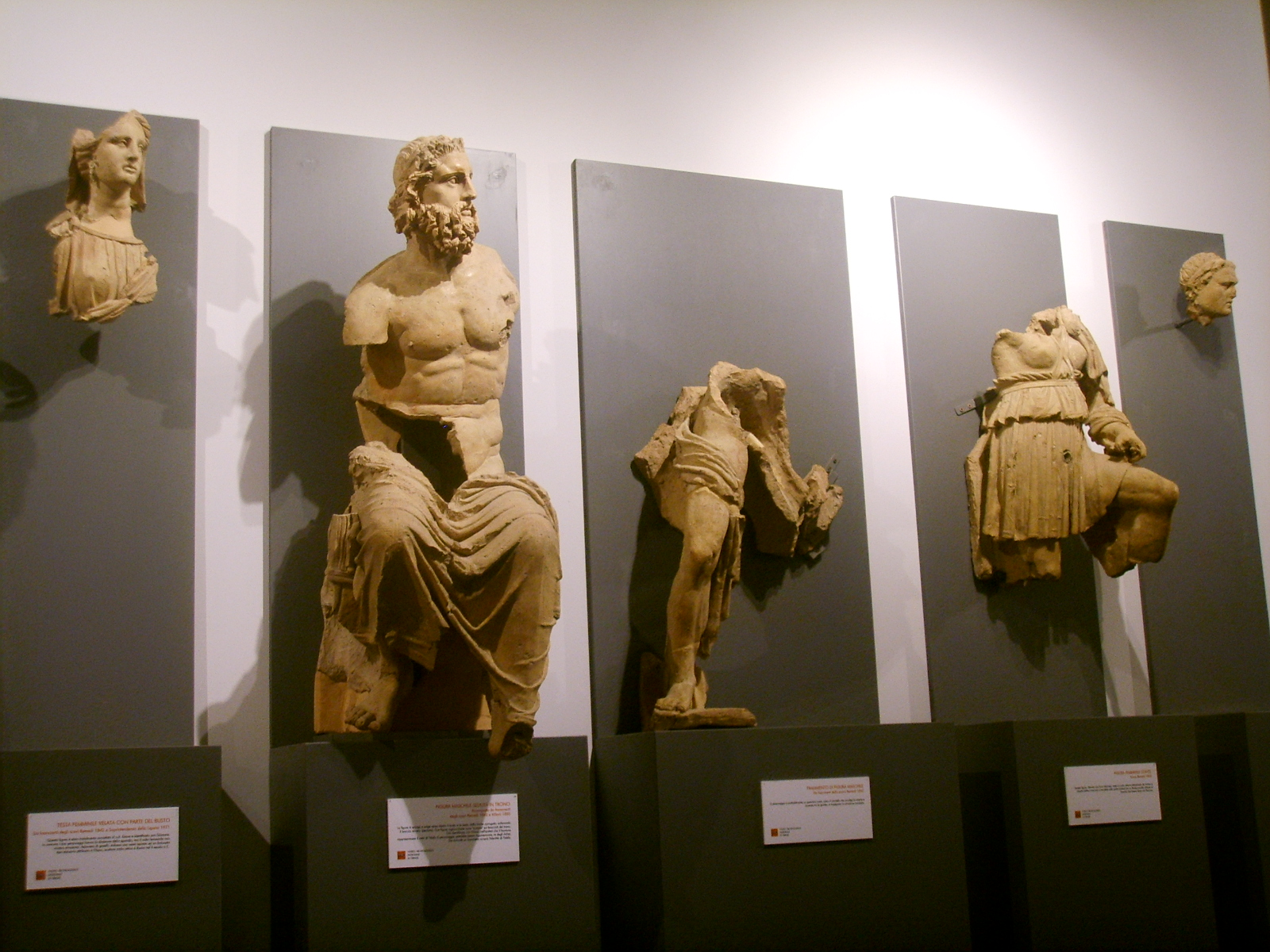
Fragments from a temple pediment group in terracotta, late period, National Archaeological Museum, Florence.

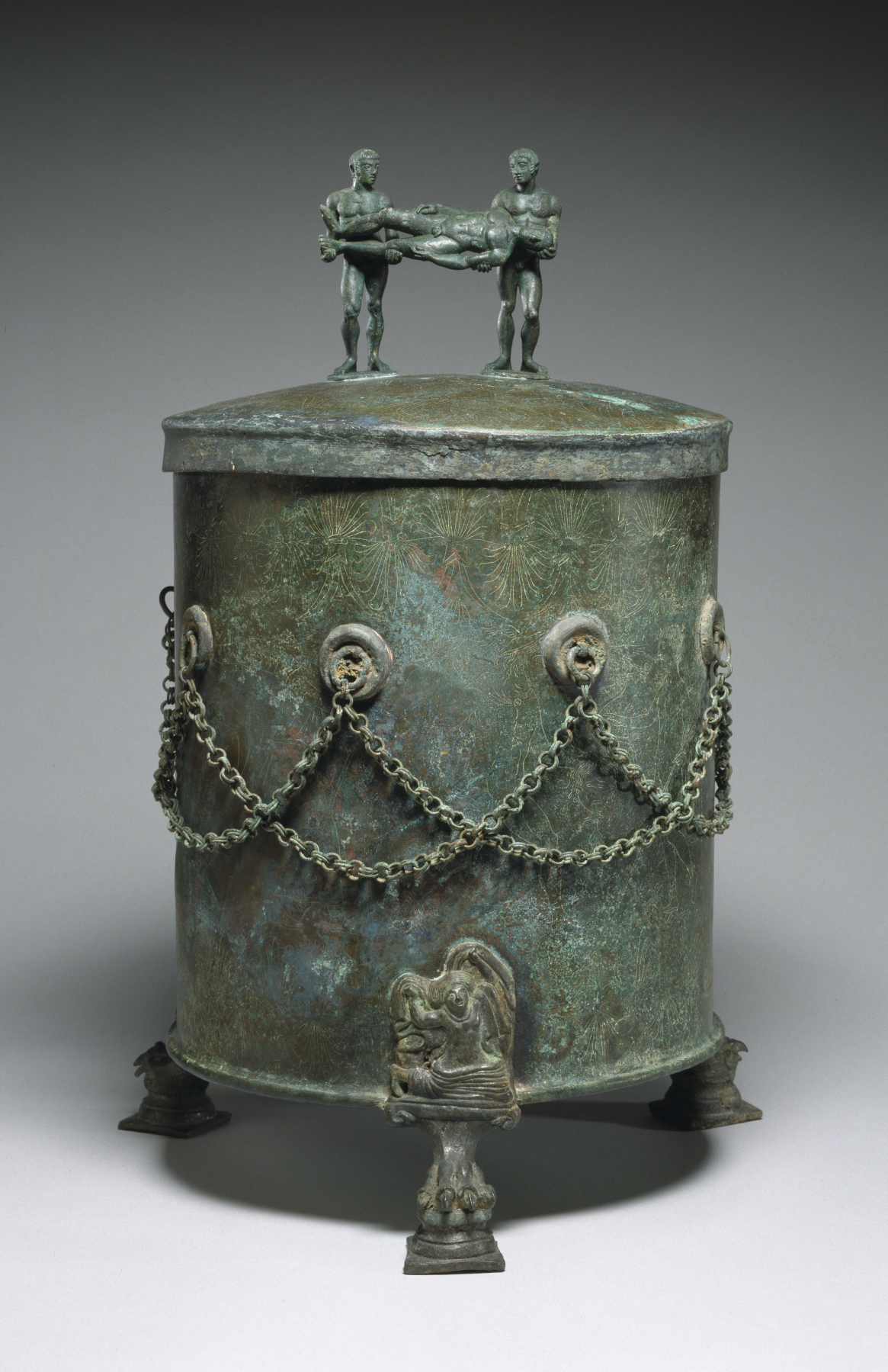
Cista depicting a Dionysian Revel and Perseus with Medusa's Head from Praeneste, 4th century BC. The complex engraved images are hard to see here. Walters Art Museum, Baltimore.

Etruscan art was produced by the Etruscan civilization in central Italy between the 10th and 1st centuries BC. From around 750 BC it was heavily influenced by Greek art, which was imported by the Etruscans, but always retained distinct characteristics. Particularly strong in this tradition were figurative sculpture in terracotta (especially life-size on sarcophagi or temples), wall-painting, and metalworking, especially in bronze. Jewellery and engraved gems of high quality were produced.

Etruscan cast-bronze sculpture was renowned and widely exported, but relatively few large examples have survived (the material was too valuable and was later recycled). In contrast to terracotta and bronze, there was relatively little Etruscan sculpture in stone, despite the Etruscans controlling fine marble sources, including Carrara marble, which seems not to have been exploited until the Romans.

The great majority of survivals came from tombs, which were typically crammed with sarcophagi and grave goods, and terracotta fragments of architectural sculpture, mostly around temples. Tombs have produced all the fresco wall-paintings, which show scenes of feasting and some narrative mythological subjects.

Bucchero wares in black were the early and native styles of fine Etruscan pottery. There was also a tradition of elaborate Etruscan vase painting, which sprang from its Greek equivalent; the Etruscans were the main export market for Greek vases. Etruscan temples were heavily decorated with colourfully painted terracotta antefixes and other fittings, which survive in large numbers where the wooden superstructure has vanished. Etruscan art was strongly connected to religion; the afterlife was of major importance in Etruscan art.

== History ==
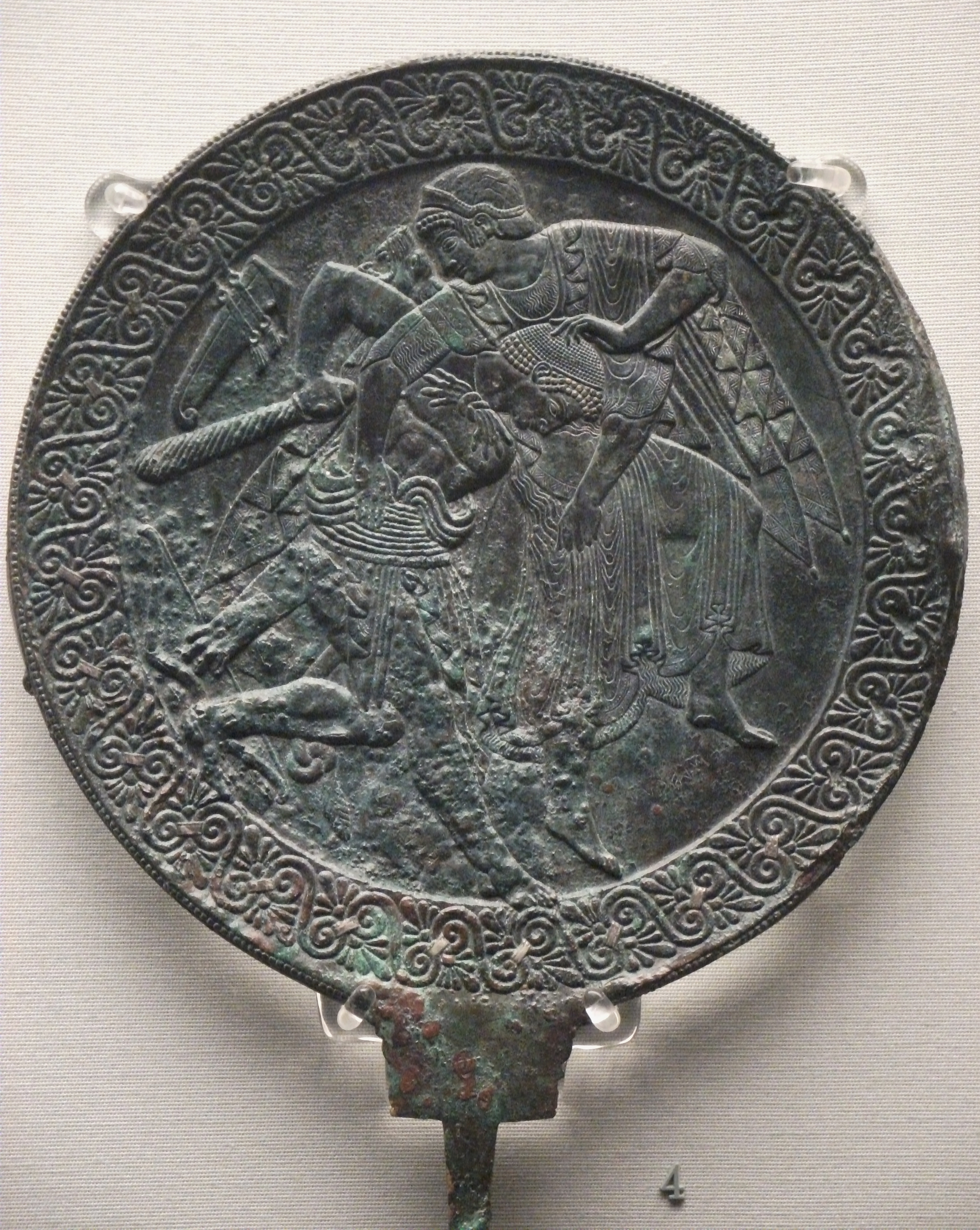
Relief mirror-back with "Herekele" (Hercules) seizing Mlacuch (500–475 BC)

The Etruscans emerged from the Villanovan culture. Due to the proximity and/or commercial contact to Etruria, other ancient cultures influenced Etruscan art during the Orientalizing period, such as Greece, Phoenicia, Egypt, Assyria and the Middle East. The Romans would later come to absorb the Etruscan culture into theirs, but would also be greatly influenced by them and their art.

=== Periods ===
Etruscan art is usually divided into several periods:

- 900 to 700 BC – Villanovan period. Already, the emphasis on funerary art is evident. Impasto pottery with geometric decoration, or shaped as hut urns. Bronze objects, mostly small except for vessels, were decorated by moulding or by incised lines. Small statuettes were mostly handles or other fittings for vessels.
- 700–575 BC – Orientalising period. Foreign trade with established Mediterranean civilisations interested in the metal ores of Etruria and other products from further north led to imports of foreign art, especially that of Ancient Greece, and some Greek artists immigrated. Decoration adopted a Greek and Near Eastern vocabulary with palmettes and other motifs, and the foreign lion was a popular animal to depict. The Etruscan upper class grew wealthy and began to fill their large tombs with grave goods. A native Bucchero pottery, now using the potter's wheel, went alongside the start of a Greek-influenced tradition of painted vases, which until 600 drew more from Corinth than Athens. The facial features (the profile, almond-shaped eyes, large nose) in the frescoes and sculptures, and the depiction of reddish-brown men and light-skinned women, influenced by archaic Greek art, follow the artistic traditions from the Eastern Mediterranean. These images have, therefore, a very limited value for a realistic representation of the Etruscan population. It was only from the end of the 4th century B.C. that evidence of physiognomic portraits began to be found in Etruscan art, and Etruscan portraiture became more realistic.
- 575–480 BC – Archaic period. Prosperity continued to grow, and Greek influence grew to the exclusion of other Mediterranean cultures, despite the two cultures coming into conflict as their respective zones of expansion met each other. The period saw the emergence of the Etruscan temple, with its elaborate and brightly painted terracotta decorations, and other larger buildings. Figurative art, including human figures and narrative scenes, grew more prominent. The Etruscans adopted stories from Greek mythology enthusiastically. Paintings in fresco begin to be found in tombs (which the Greeks had stopped making centuries before), and were perhaps made for some other buildings. The Persian conquest of Ionia in 546 saw a significant influx of Greek artist refugees, especially in Southern Etruria. Other earlier developments continued, and the period produced much of the finest and most distinctive Etruscan art.
- 480–300 BC – Classical period. The Etruscans had now peaked in economic and political terms, and the volume of art produced reduced somewhat in the 5th century BC, with prosperity shifting from the coastal cities to the interior, especially the Po Valley. In the 4th century BC volumes revived somewhat, and previous trends continued to develop without major innovations in the repertoire, except for the arrival of red-figure vase painting, and more sculpture such as sarcophagi in stone rather than terracotta. Bronzes from Vulci were exported widely within Etruria and beyond. The Romans were now picking off the Etruscan cities one by one, with Veii being conquered around 396 BC.
- 300–50 BC – Hellenistic or late phase. During this period, the remaining Etruscan cities were all gradually absorbed into Roman culture, and, especially around the 1st century BC, the extent to which art and architecture should be described as Etruscan or Roman is often difficult to judge. Distinctive Etruscan types of objects gradually ceased to be made, with the last painted vases appearing early in the period, and large painted tombs ending in the 2nd century. Styles continued to follow broad Greek trends, with increasing sophistication and classical realism often accompanied by a loss of energy and character. Bronze statues, now increasingly large, were sometimes replicas of Greek models. The large Greek temple pedimental sculpture groups of sculptures were introduced, but in terracotta.

== Sculpture ==
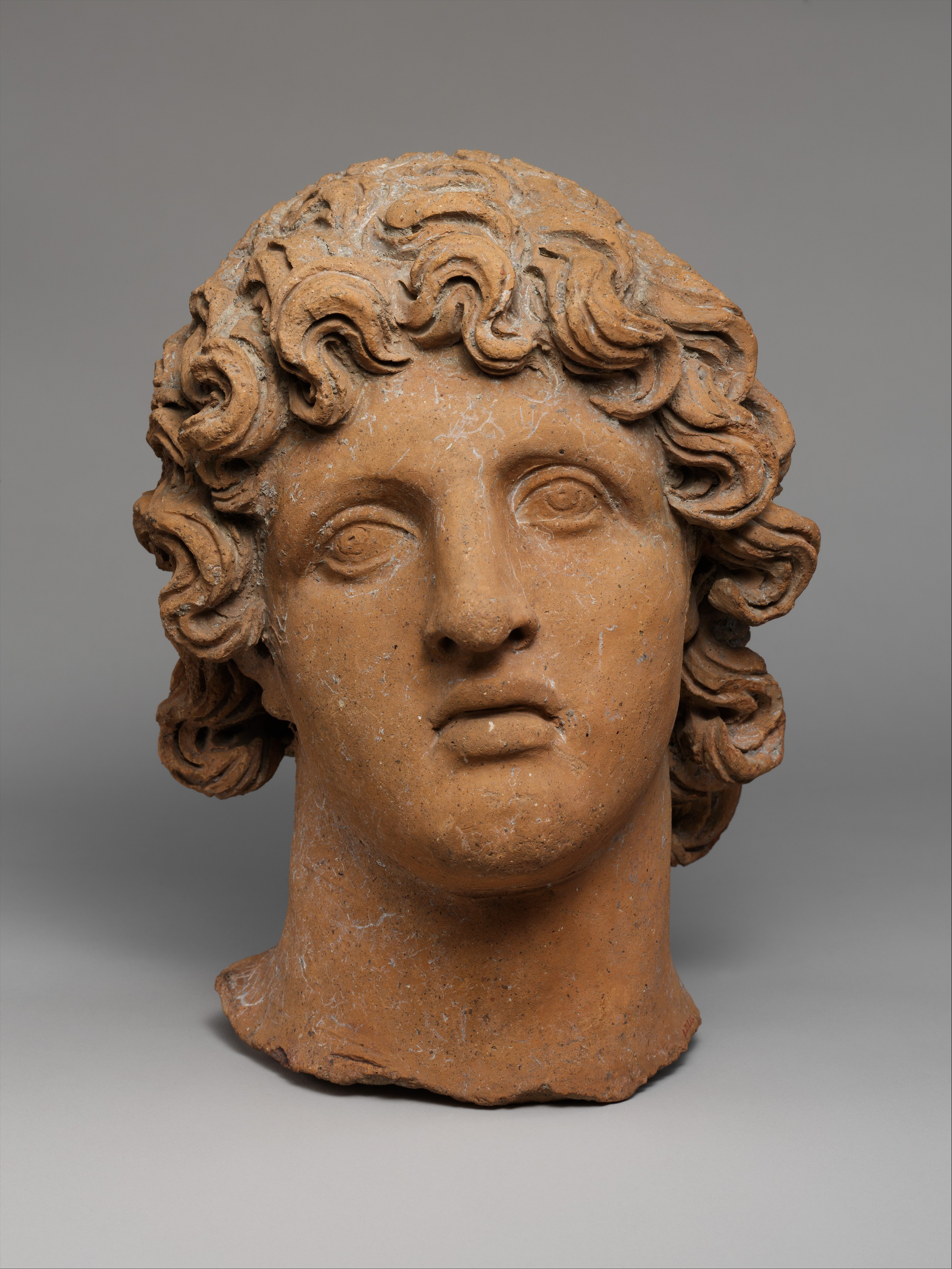
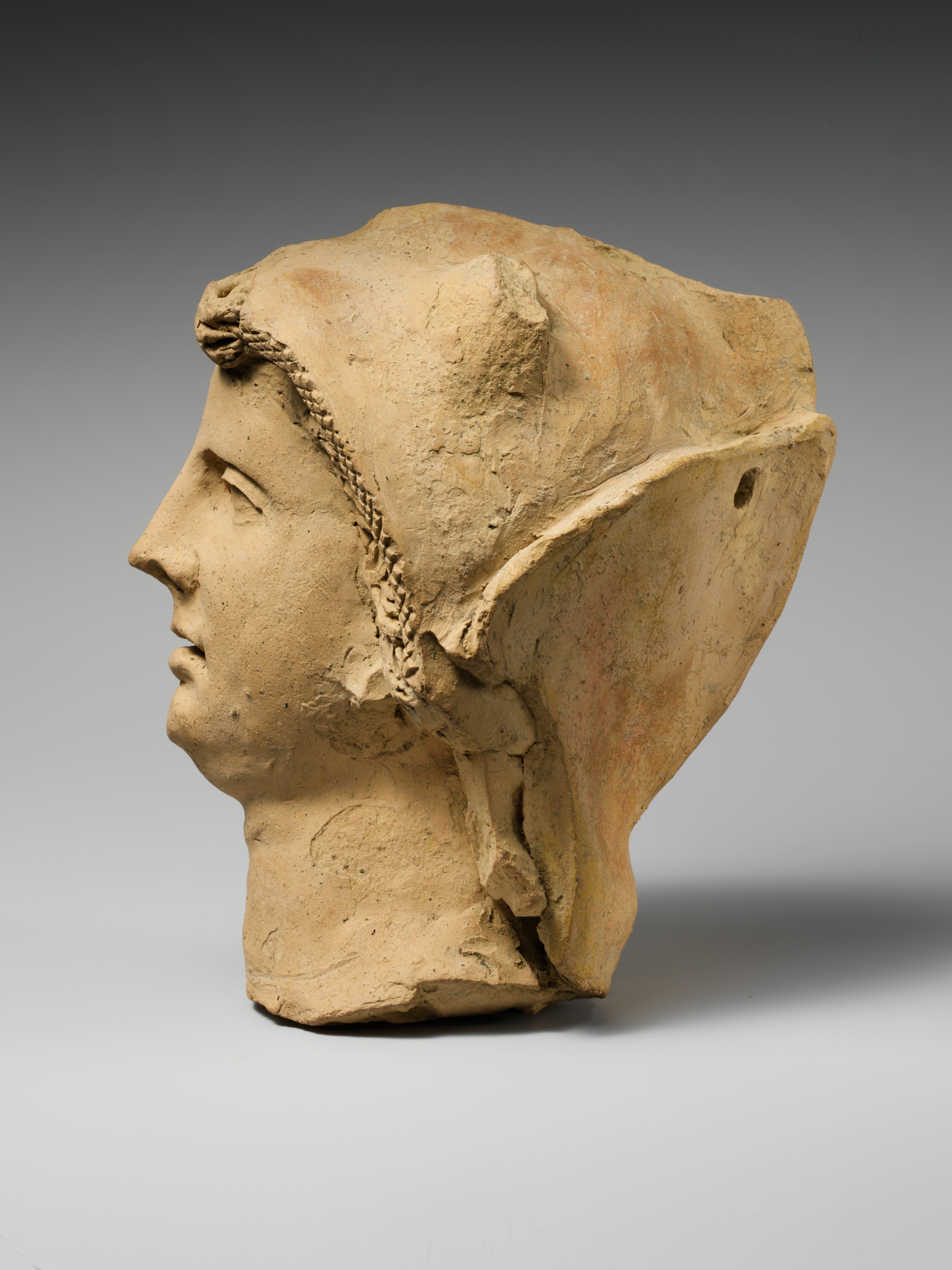
Terracotta heads of Etruscan male youths, with one bare-headed and the other wearing a helmet, 3rd–2nd centuries BC, Metropolitan Museum of Art, New York City

The Etruscans were very accomplished sculptors, with many surviving examples in terracotta, both small-scale and monumental, bronze, and alabaster. However, there is very little in stone, in contrast to the Greeks and Romans. Terracotta sculptures from temples have nearly all had to be reconstructed from a mass of fragments, but sculptures from tombs, including the distinctive form of sarcophagus tops with near life-size reclining figures, have usually survived in good condition, although the painting on them has usually suffered. Small bronze pieces, often including sculptural decoration, became an important industry in later periods, exported to the Romans and others. See the "Metalwork" section below for these, and "Funerary art" for tomb art.

The famous bronze "Capitoline Wolf" in the Capitoline Museum, Rome, was long regarded as Etruscan; its age is now disputed, and it may actually date from the 12th century.

- The Etruscan Head, 600 BC, Archaeological Museum in Milan.
- The Centaur of Vulci, 590–580 BC, National Etruscan Museum at Villa Giulia, in Rome
- the painted terracotta Apollo of Veii, 510–500 BC, from the temple at Portanaccio attributed to Vulca at the National Etruscan Museum in Rome
- the painted terracotta Sarcophagus of the Spouses, late 6th century BC, from Cerveteri at the National Etruscan Museum; there is a similar one in the Louvre
- the bronze Chimera of Arezzo, dated 400 BC, at the National Archaeological Museum in Florence
- The Mars of Todi, a bronze sculpture from 400 BC in the Museo Etrusco Gregoriano of the Vatican
- The Sarcophagus of Seianti Hanunia Tlesnasa, 150–140 BC, a masterpiece of Etruscan art in terracotta, now at the British Museum
- The Orator, or Aule Metele ("L'Arringatore" in Italian), bronze found in Umbria now at the National Archaeological Museum in Florence

The Apollo of Veii is a good example of the mastery with which Etruscan artists produced these large art pieces. It was made, along with others, to adorn the temple at Portanaccio's roof line. Although its style is reminiscent of the Greek Kroisos Kouros, having statues on the top of the roof was an original Etruscan idea.

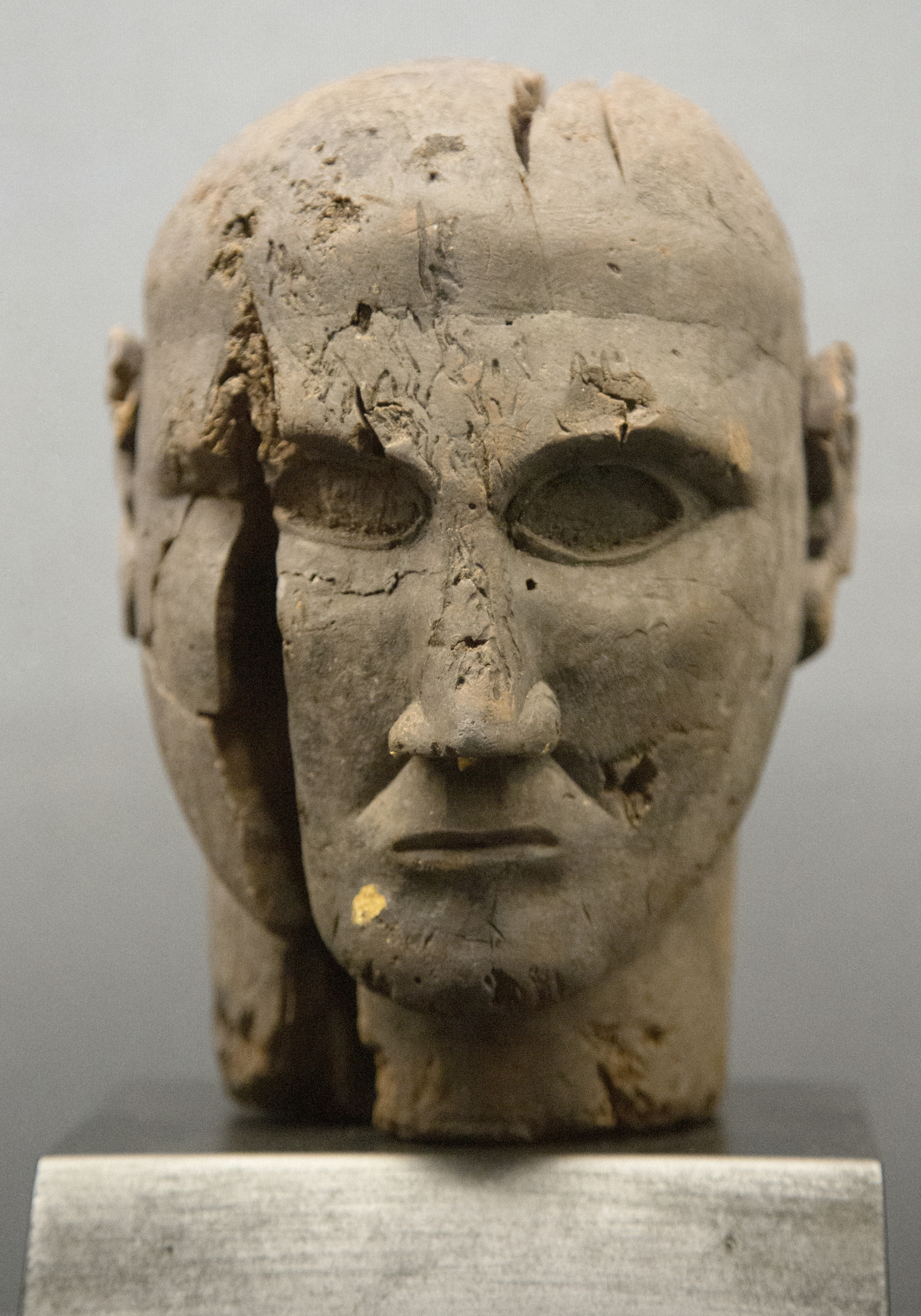
Etruscan pear wood head, 7th century BC

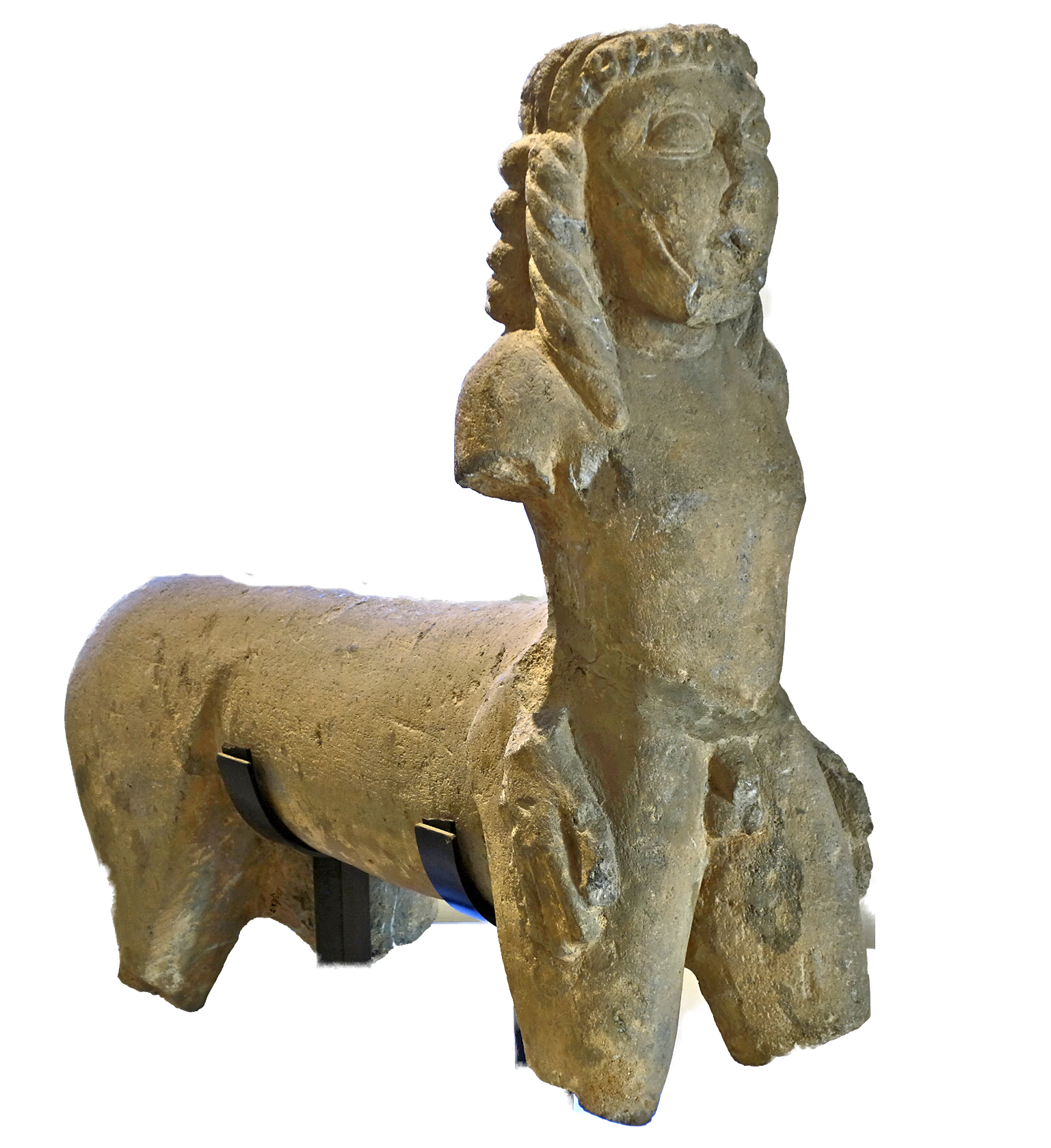
Centaur of Vulci, c. 590–580 BC

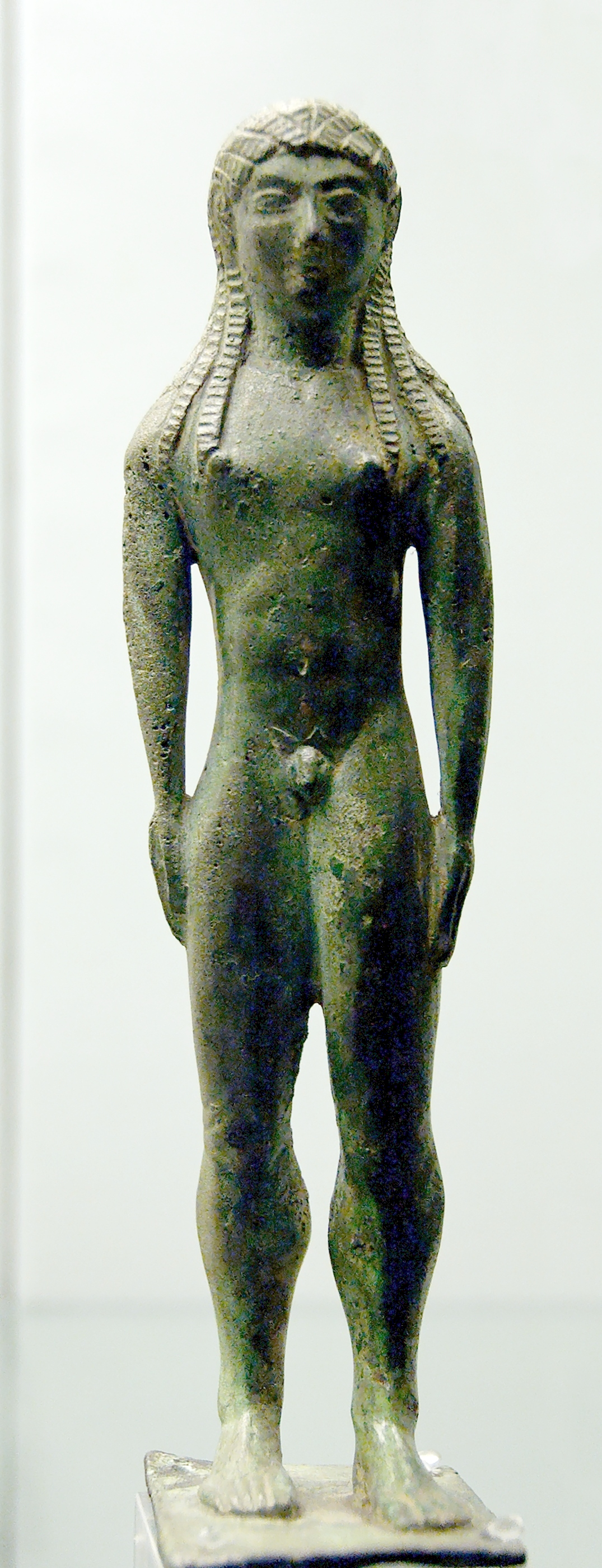
Naked youth, votive statuette. Bronze. Chiusi, 550–530 BC

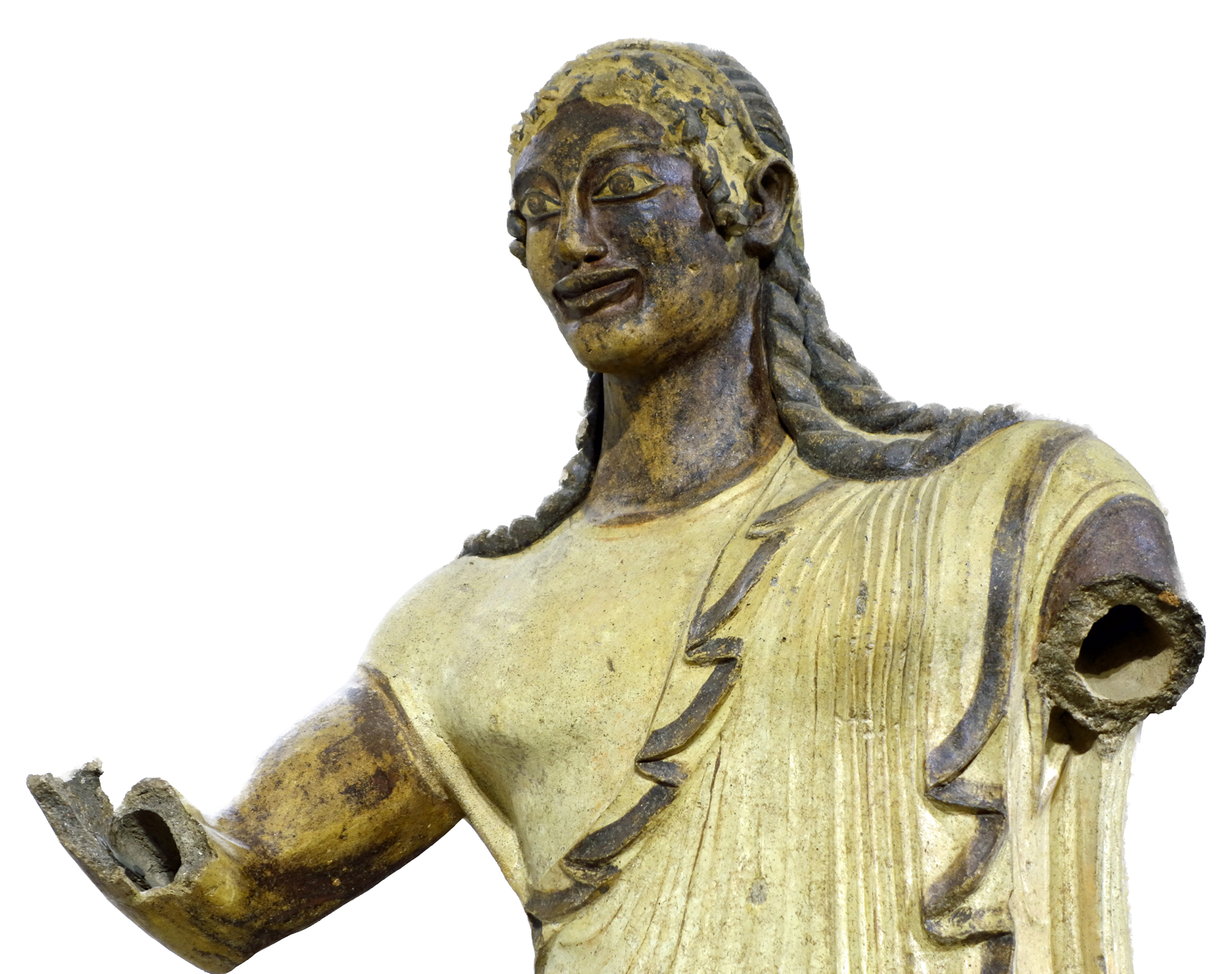
Apollo of Veii, c. 550–520 BC

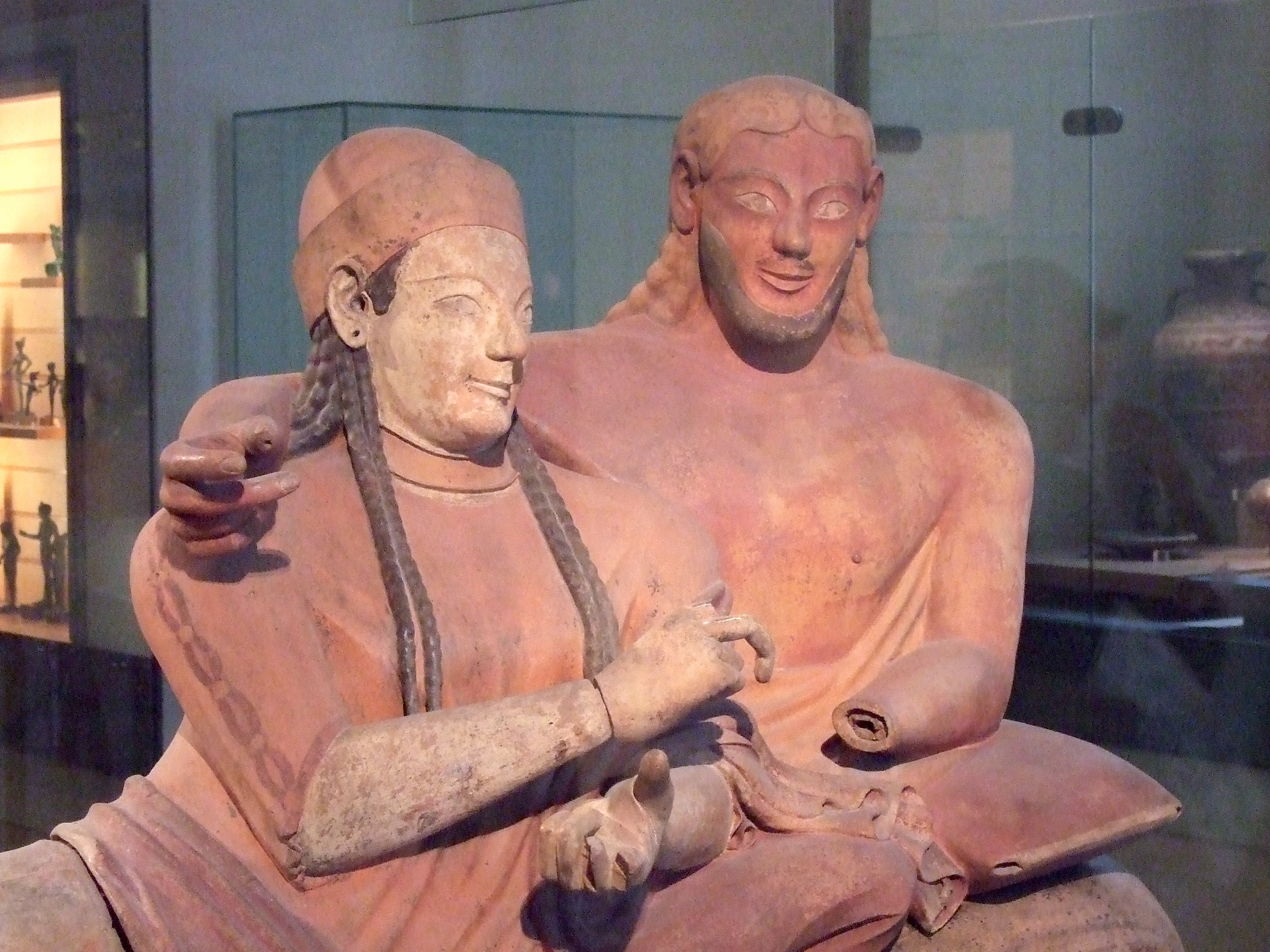
Detail of the Louvre Sarcophagus of the Spouses

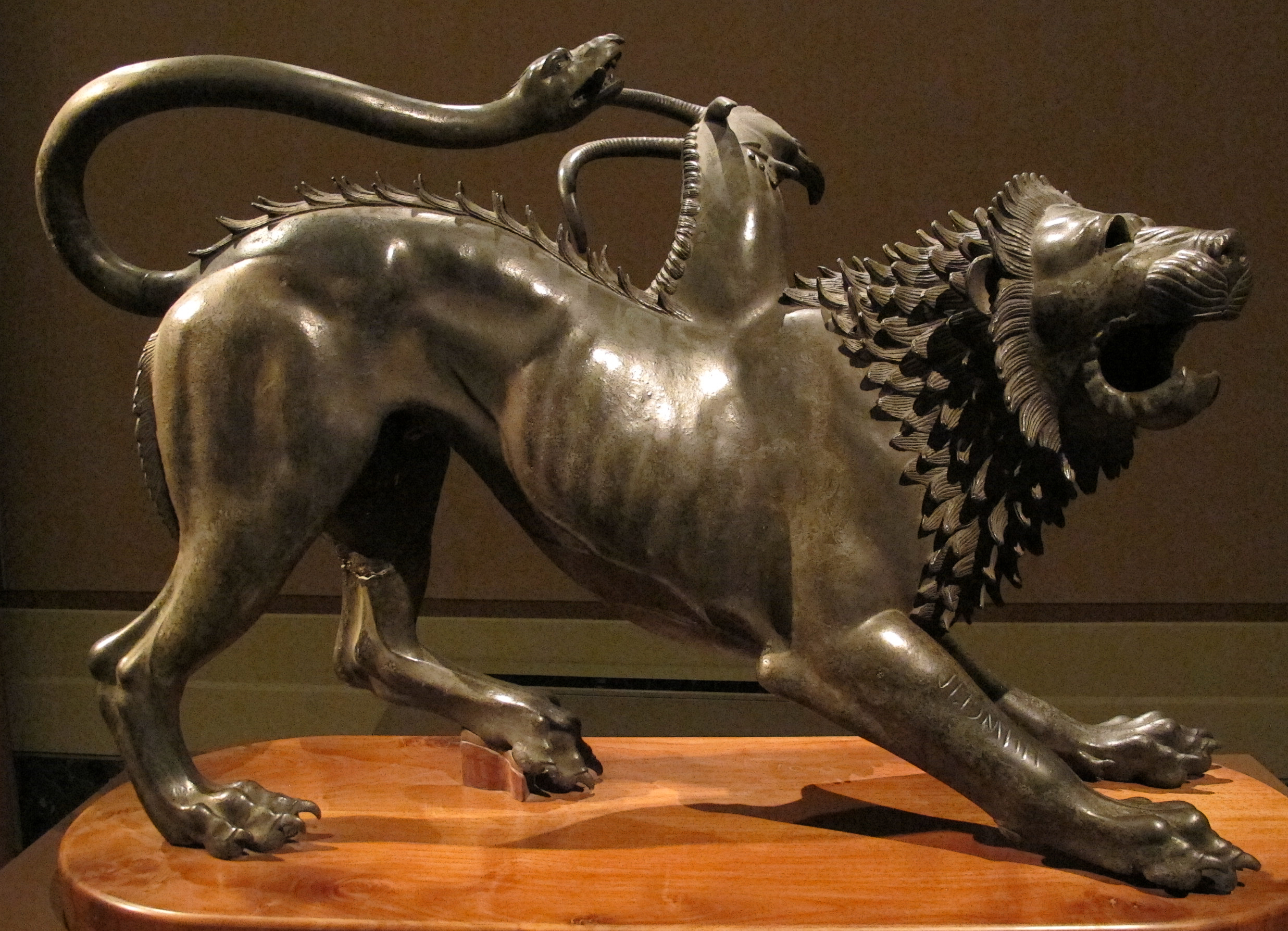
Chimera of Arezzo, bronze, c. 400 BC

Tarquínia Winged-Horses 4th century BC, exhibited at National Museum of Tarquinia

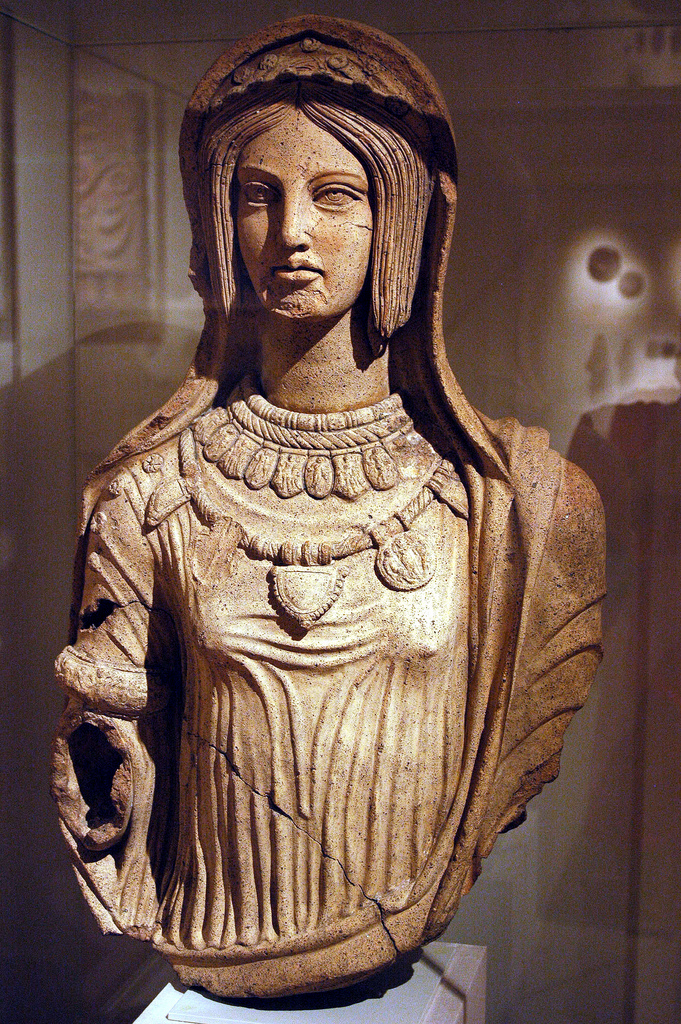
Terracotta figure of a young woman, late 4th–early 3rd century BC

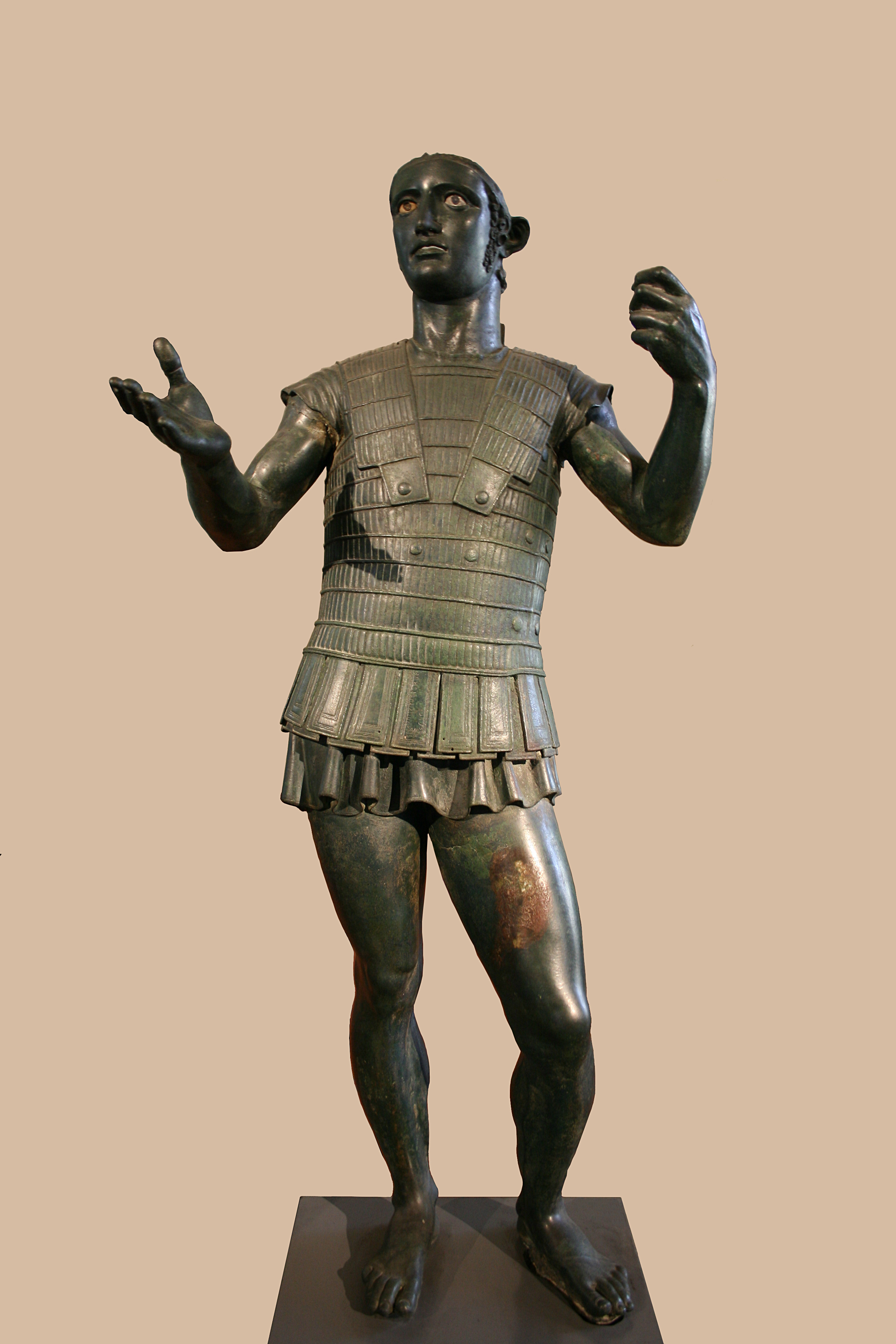
Mars of Todi, bronze, c. 400 BC

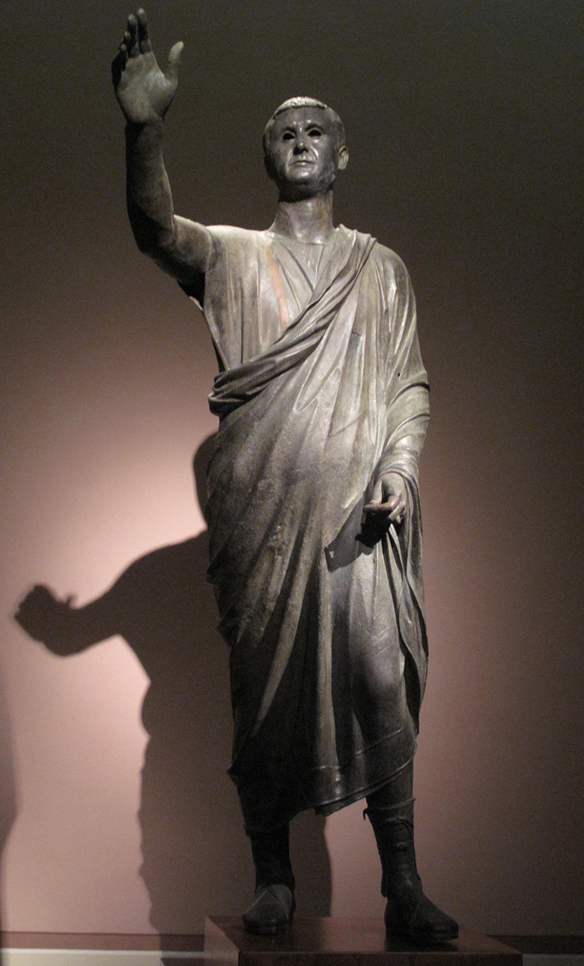
The Orator, Romano-Etruscan bronze statue, c. 100 BC

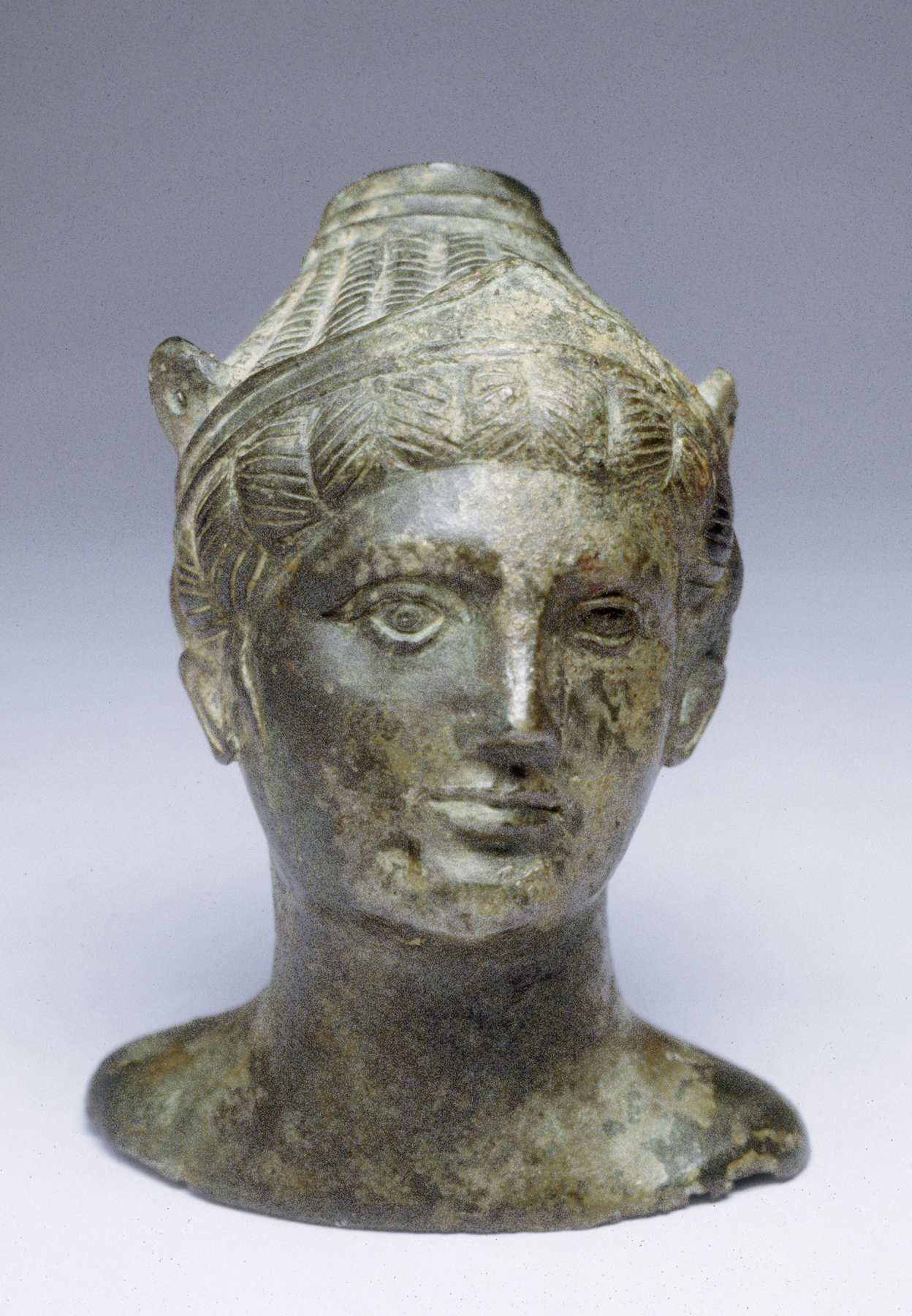
Bronze perfume container in the form of a deity with winged helmet

== Wall-painting ==
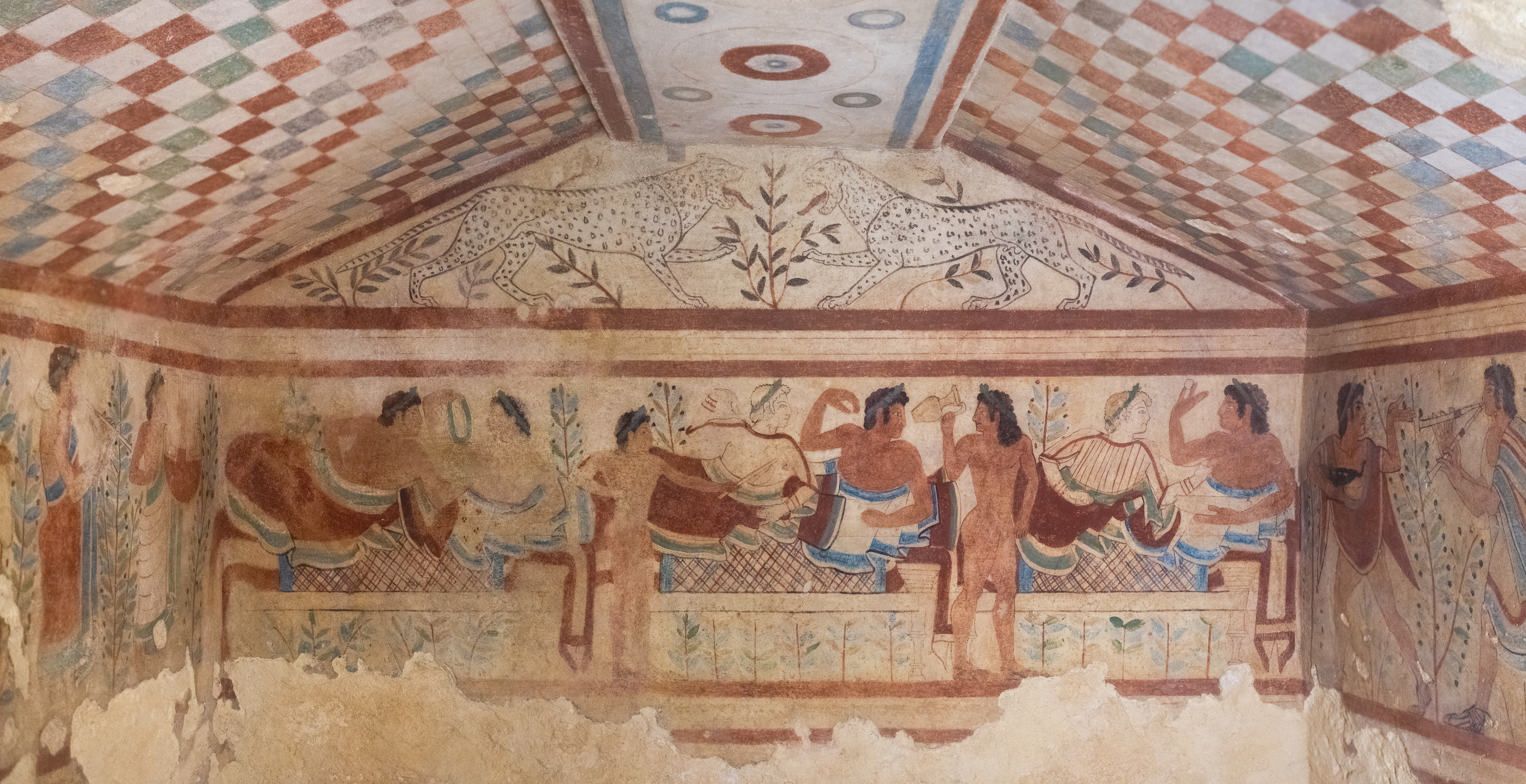
Confronted leopards above a banqueting scene in the Tomb of the Leopards, c. 480–450 BC.

The Etruscan paintings that have survived are almost all wall frescoes from tombs, mainly located in Tarquinia, and dating from roughly 670 BC to 200 BC, with the peak of production between about 520 and 440 BC. The Greeks very rarely painted their tombs in the equivalent period, with rare exceptions such as the Tomb of the Diver in Paestum and southern Italy, and the Macedonian royal tombs at Vergina. The whole tradition of Greek painting on walls and panels, arguably the form of art that Greek contemporaries considered their greatest, is almost entirely lost, giving the Etruscan tradition, which undoubtedly drew much from Greek examples, an added importance, even if it does not approach the quality and sophistication of the best Greek masters. It is clear from literary sources that temples, houses, and other buildings also had wall-paintings, but these have all been lost, like their Greek equivalents.

The Etruscan tombs, which housed the remains of whole lineages, were apparently sites for recurrent family rituals, and the subjects of paintings probably have a more religious character than might at first appear. A few detachable painted terracotta panels have been found in tombs, up to about a metre tall, and fragments in city centres.

The frescoes are created by applying paint on top of fresh plaster, so that when the plaster dries, the painting becomes part of the plaster, and consequently an integral part of the wall. Colours were created from ground-up minerals of different colours and were then mixed into the paint. Fine brushes were made of animal hair.

From the mid 4th century BC chiaroscuro modelling began to be used to portray depth and volume. Sometimes scenes of everyday life are portrayed, but more often traditional mythological scenes, usually recognisable from Greek mythology, which the Etruscans seem largely to have adopted. Symposium scenes are common, and sport and hunting scenes are found. The depiction of human anatomy never approaches Greek levels. The concept of proportion does not appear in any surviving frescoes, and we frequently find portrayals of animals or men out of proportion. Various types of ornament cover much of the surface between figurative scenes.

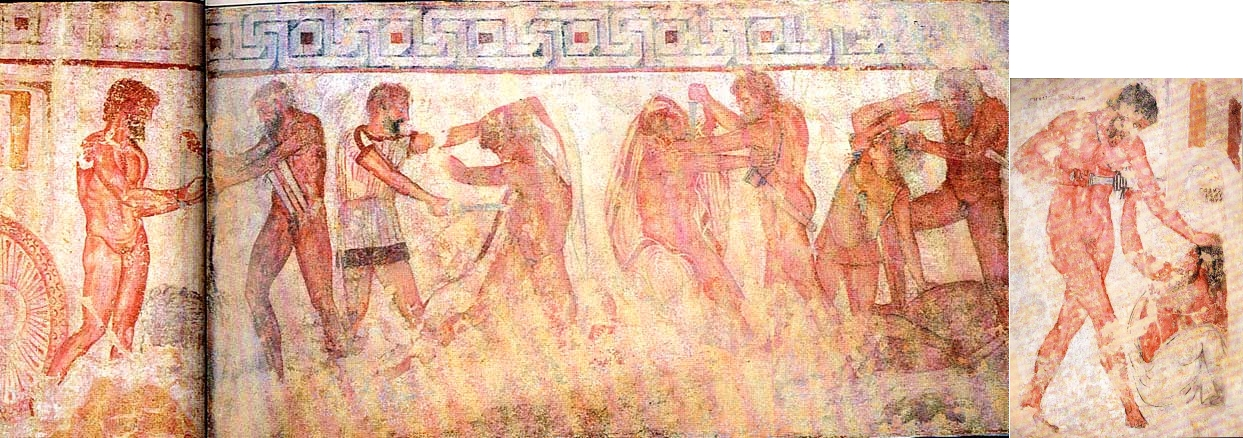
Fresco in the François Tomb: Liberation of Celio Vibenna, from left to right: Caile Vibenna, Mastarna, Larth Ultes, Laris Papathnas Velznach, Pesna Aremsnas Sveamach, Rasce, Venthikau, and Aule Vibenna, right: Marce Camitlnas et Cnaeve Tarchunies Rumach

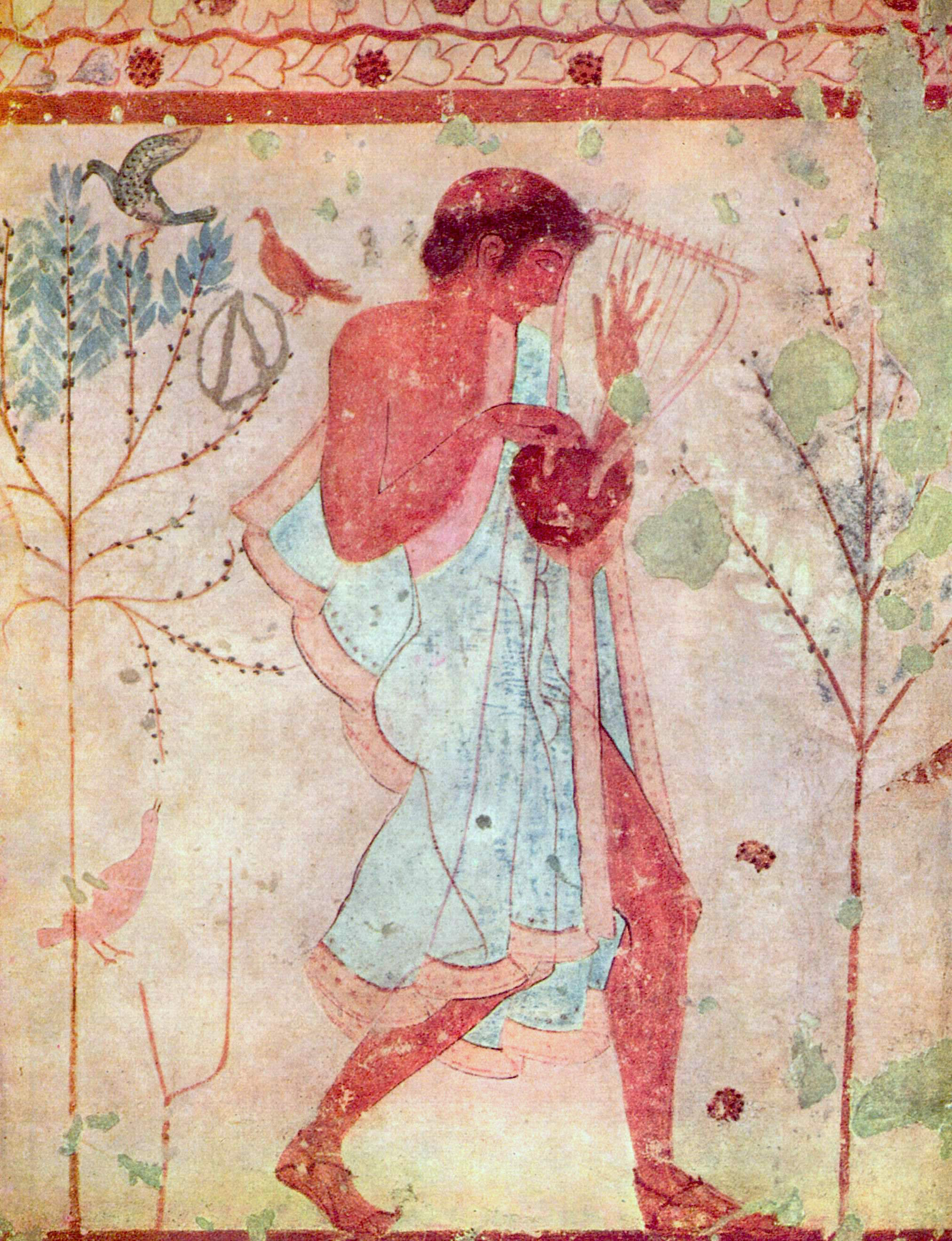
Fresco of an Etruscan musician with a barbiton, Tomb of the Triclinium, Tarquinia

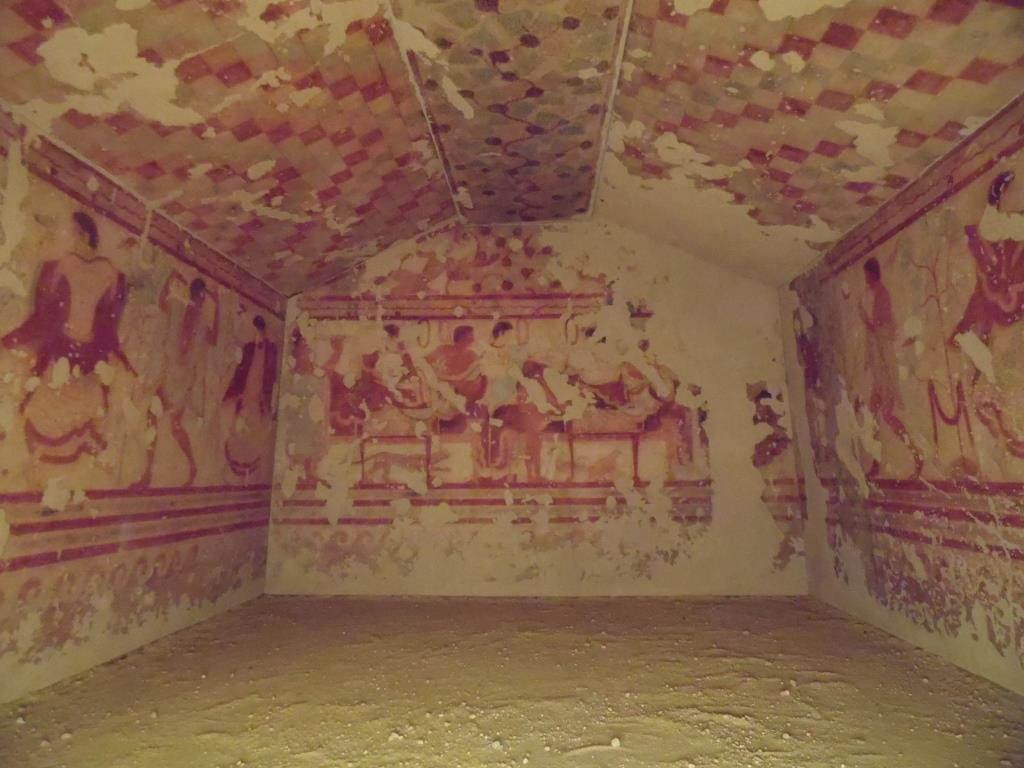
Fuller view of the Tomb of the Triclinium

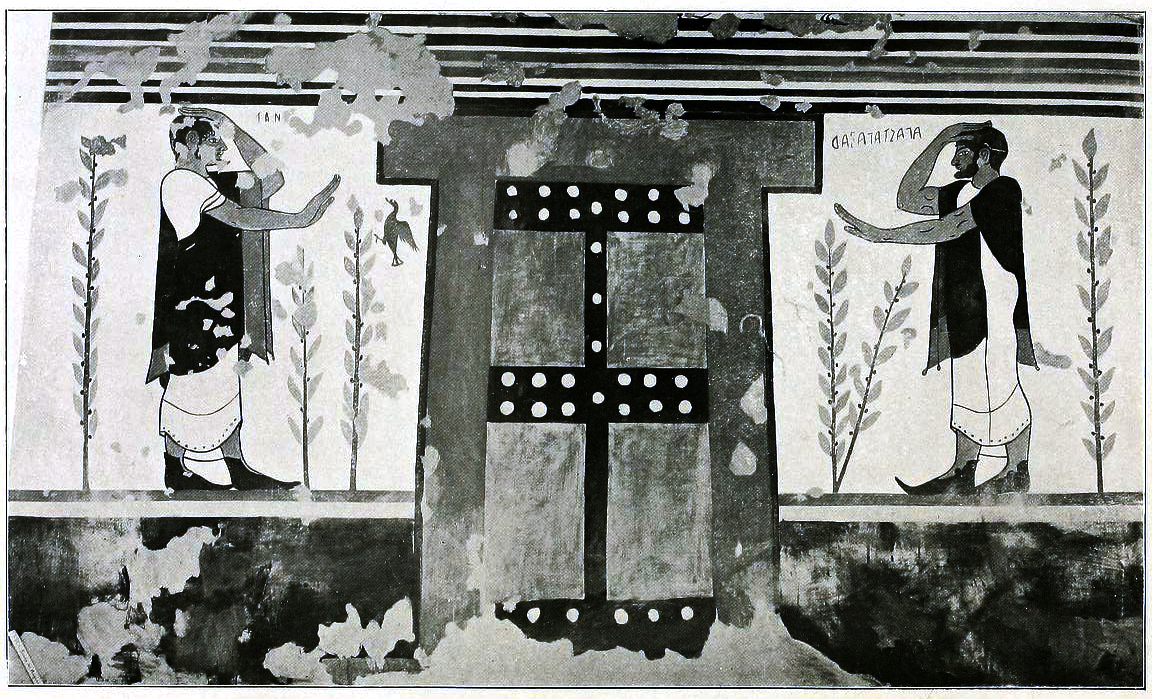
Rear wall painting in Tomb of the Augurs, Tarquinia

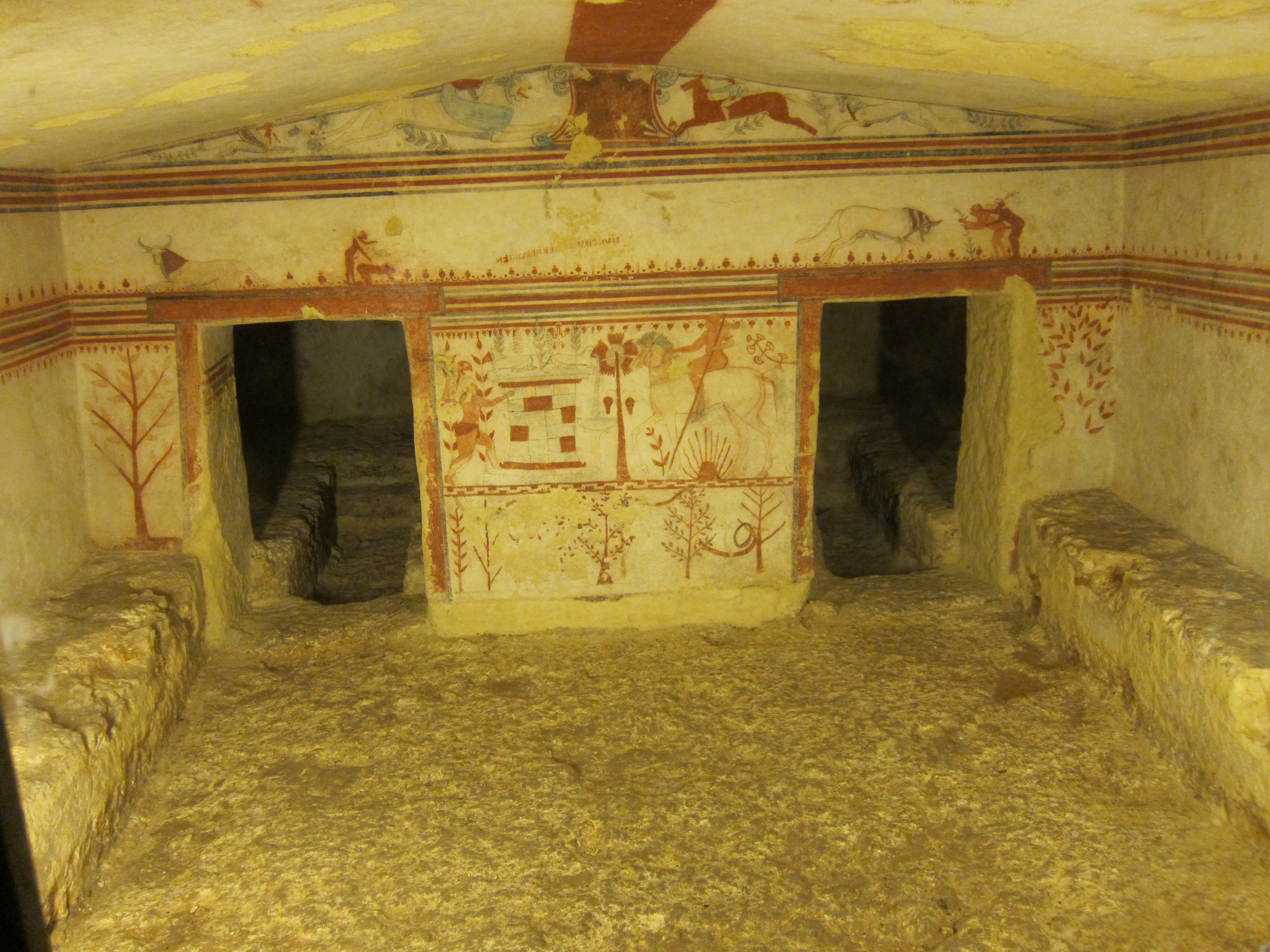
Tomb of the Bulls, back wall of main chamber. The main scene probably represents the ambush of Troilus

== Vase painting ==
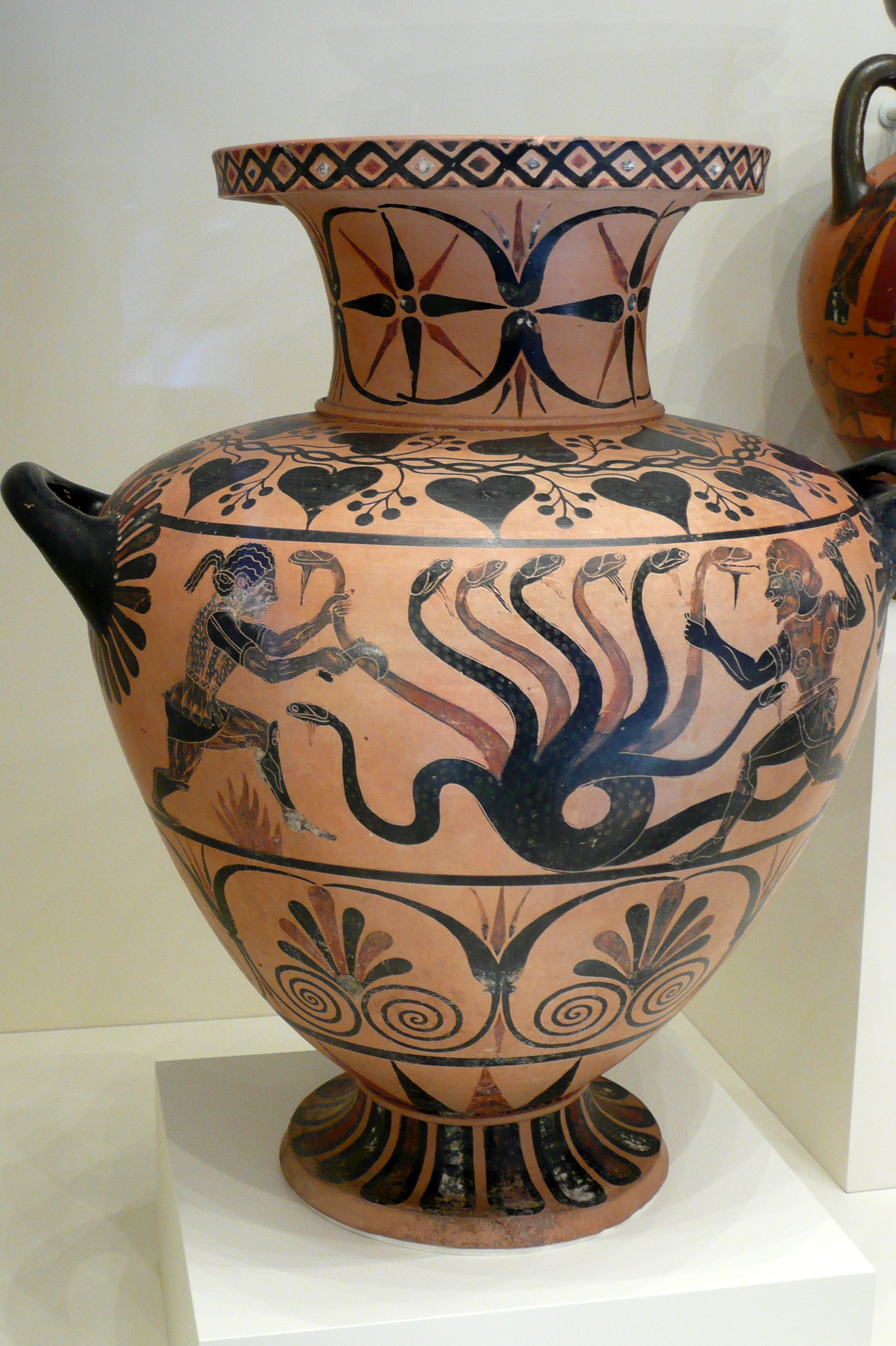
Water jar with Herakles and the Hydra, c. 525 BC

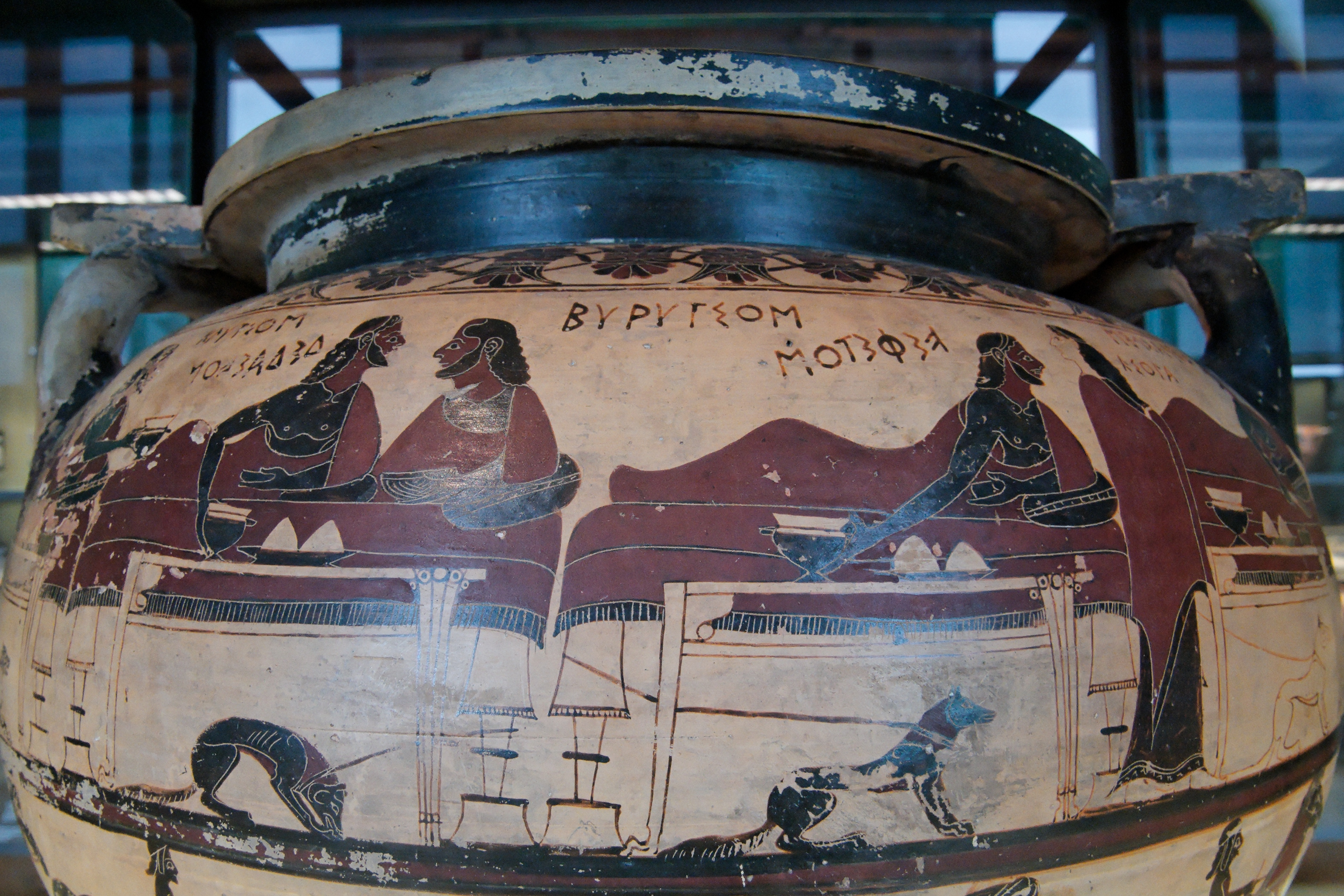
Example of Greek-style vase painting in Caere. Eurytus and Heracles in a symposium. Krater of Corinthian columns called 'Krater of Eurytus', c. 600 BC

Etruscan vase paintings were produced from the 7th through the 4th centuries BC, and are a major element in Etruscan art. It was strongly influenced by Greek vase painting, followed the main trends in style, especially those of Athens, over the period, but lagging behind by some decades. The Etruscans used the same techniques and largely the same shapes. Both the black-figure vase painting and the later red-figure vase painting techniques were used. The subjects were also very often drawn from Greek mythology in later periods.

Besides being producers in their own right, the Etruscans were the main export market for Greek pottery outside Greece, and some Greek painters probably moved to Etruria, where richly decorated vases were a standard element of grave inventories. It has been suggested that many or most elaborately painted vases were specifically bought to be used in burials, as a substitute, cheaper, and less likely to attract robbers, for the vessels in silver and bronze that the elite would have used in life.

== Bucchero ware ==
More fully characteristic of Etruscan ceramic art are the burnished, unglazed bucchero terracotta wares, rendered black in a reducing kiln deprived of oxygen. This was an Etruscan development based on the pottery techniques of the Villanovan period. Often decorated with white lines, these may have eventually represented a traditional "heritage" style kept in use especially for tomb wares.

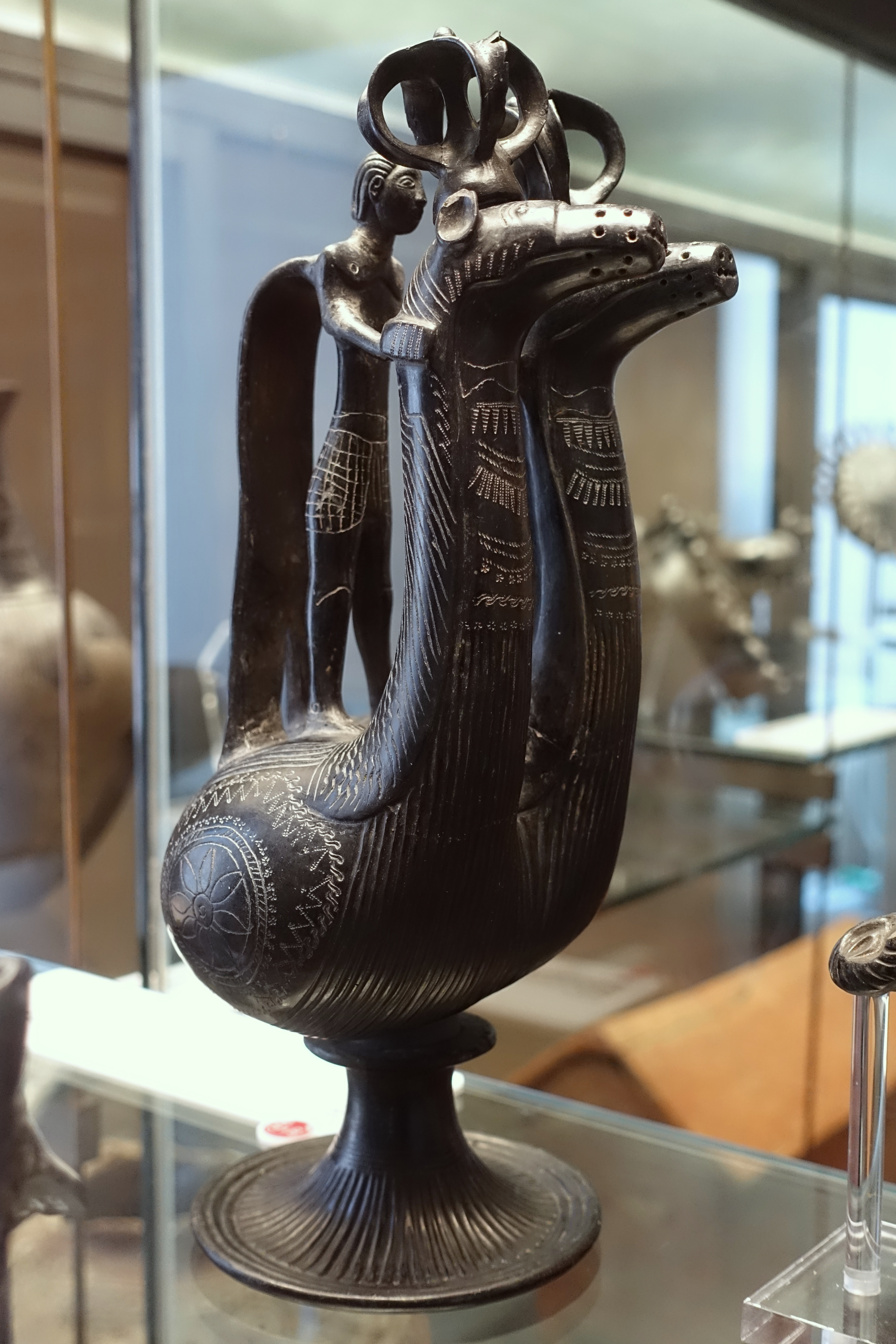
"Calabresi Ampoule", a fancy bucchero jug, 660–650 BC

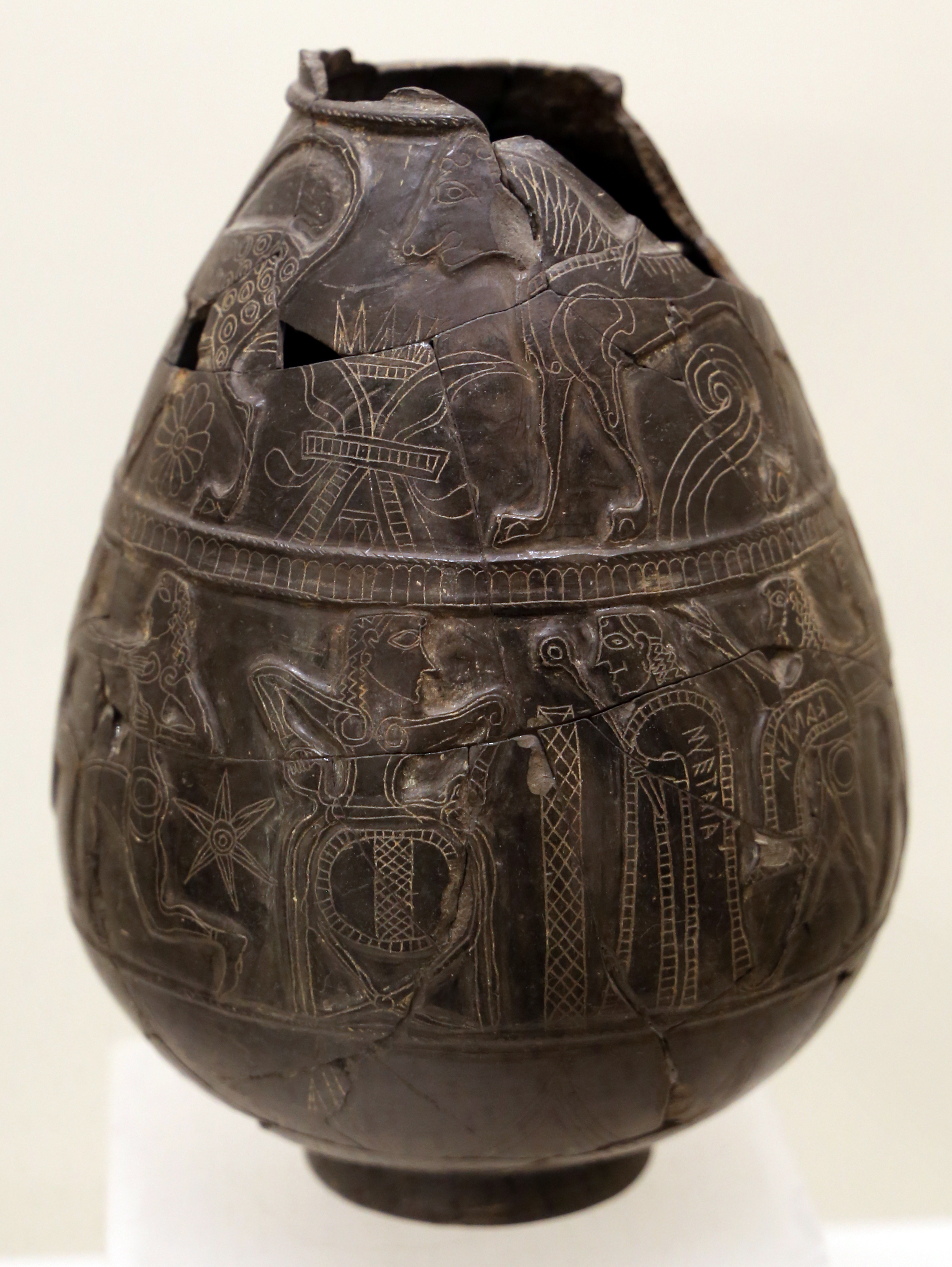
Bucchero olpe, c. 630 BC

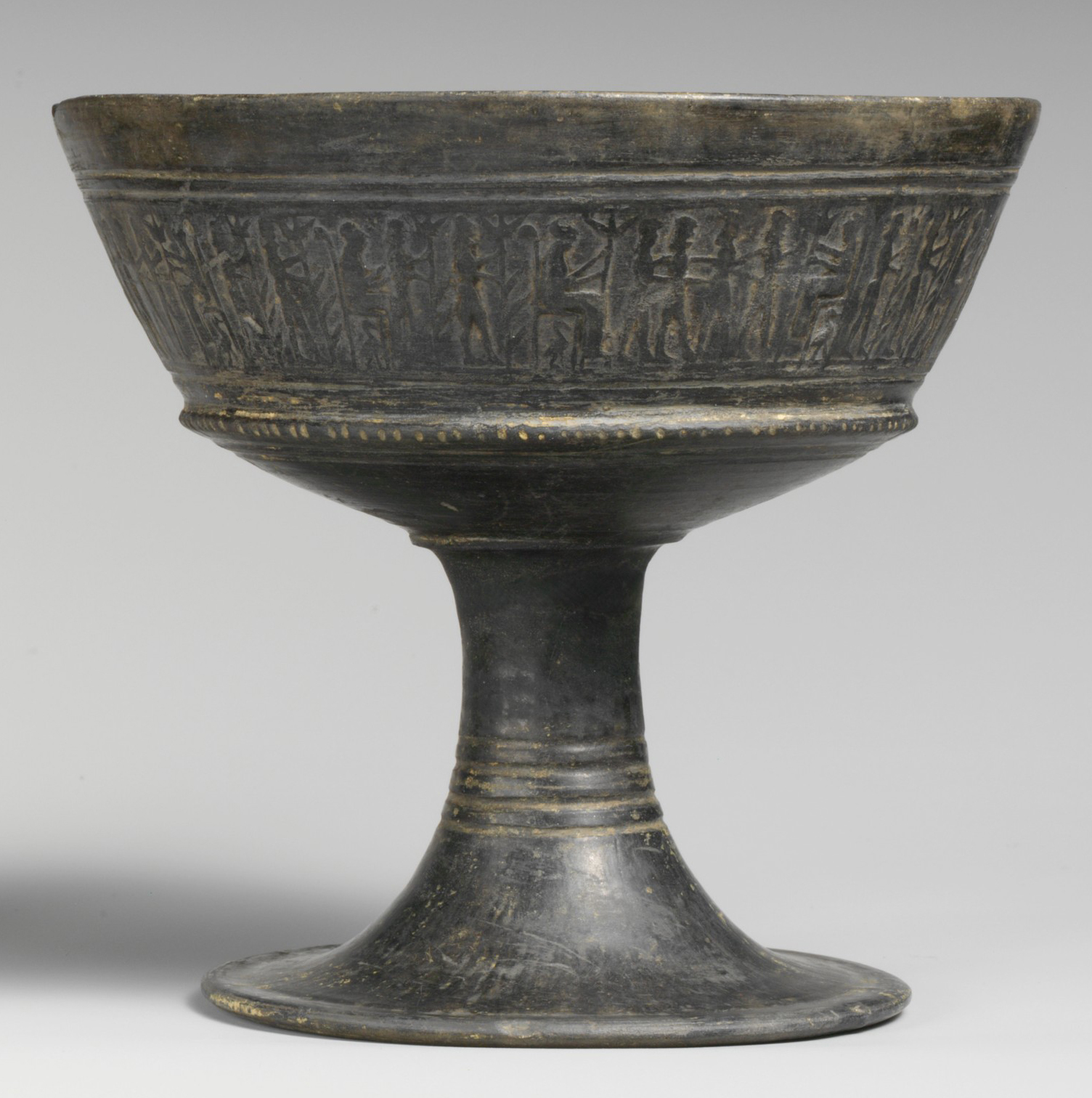
Bucchero "chalice", c. 575–550 BC

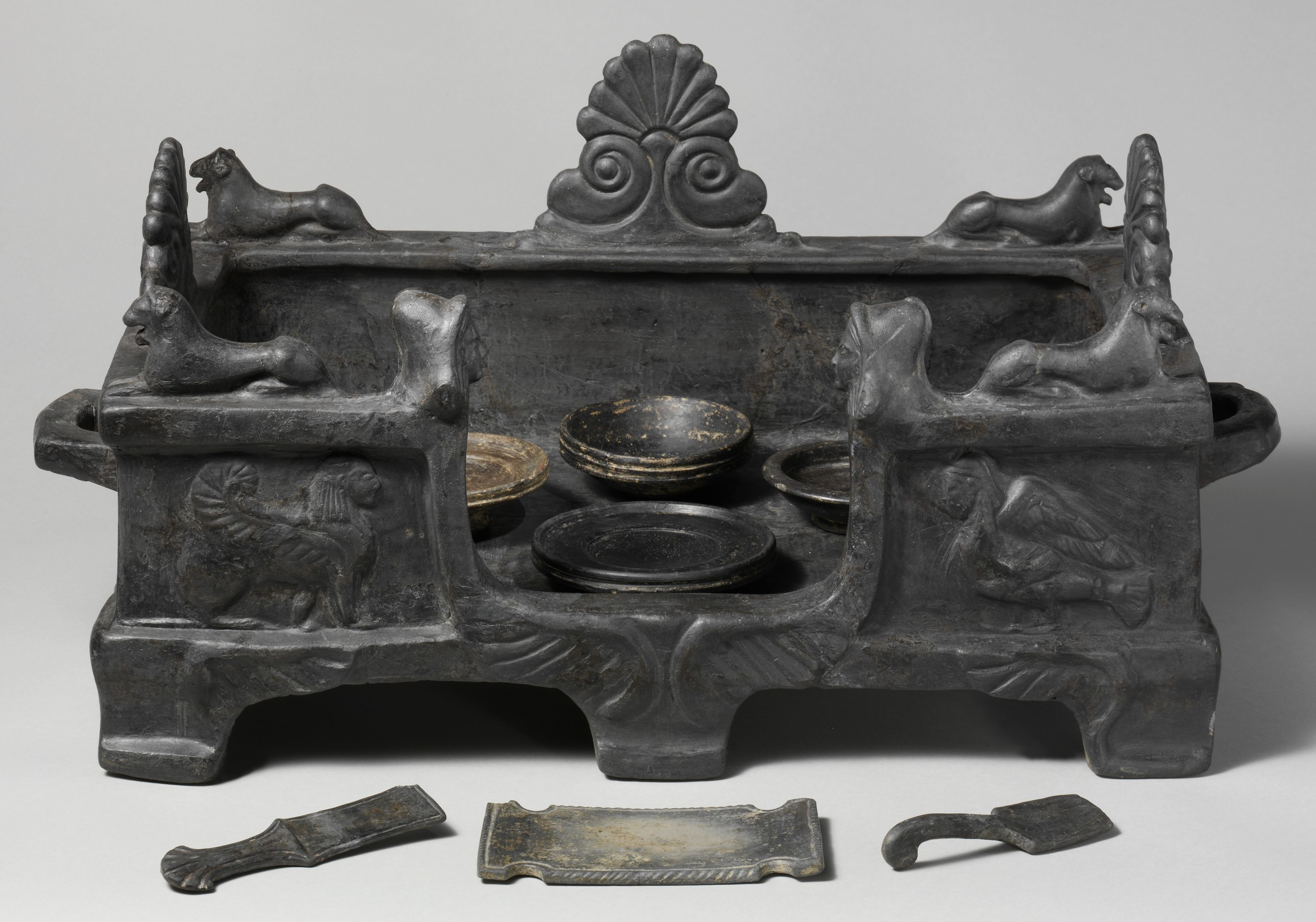
Bucchero model "offering set" for a tomb, probably copying larger metal sets used in life.

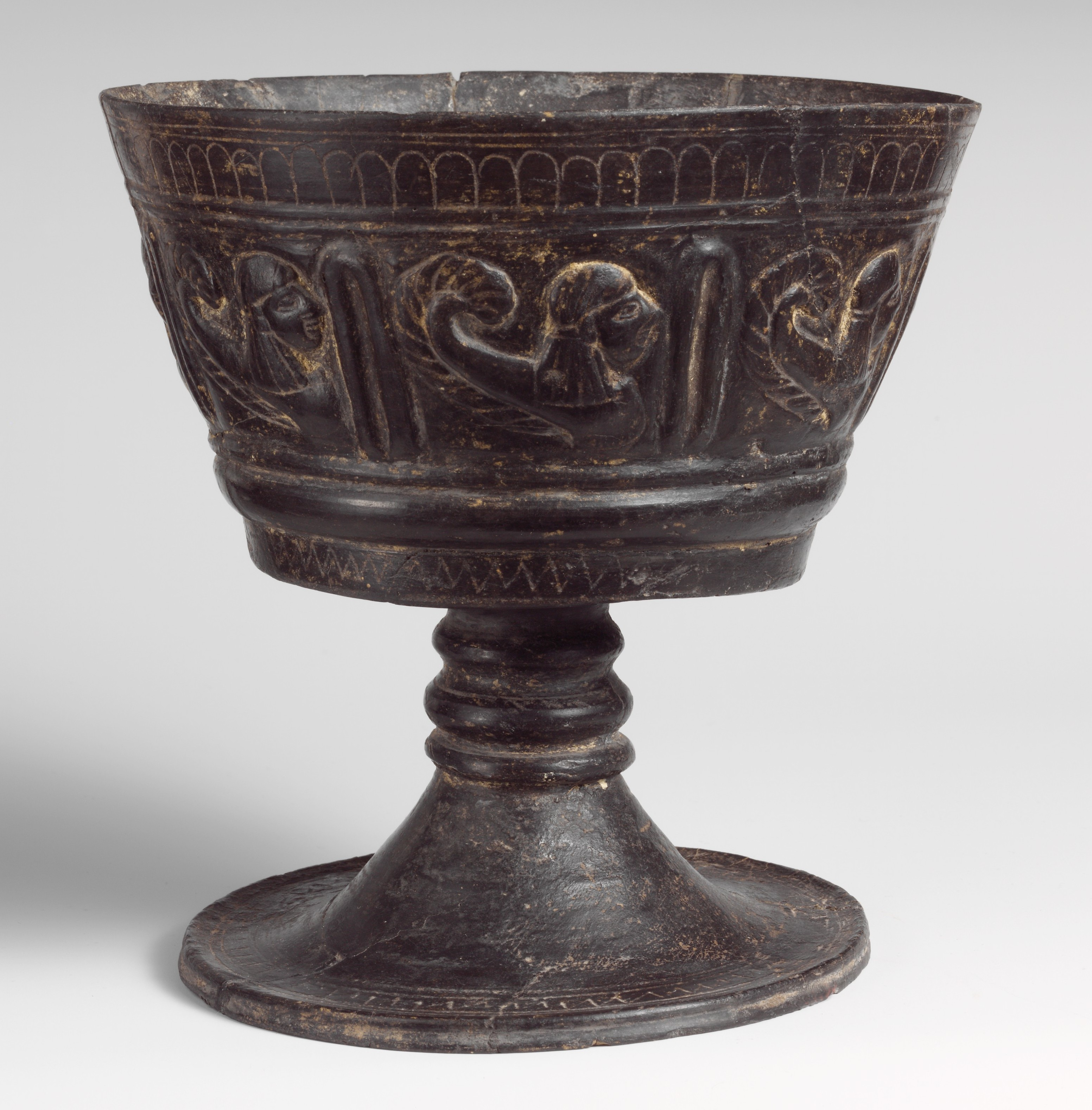
Bucchero "chalice", c. 550 BC

== Terracotta panels ==
A few large terracotta pinakes or plaques, much larger than are typical in Greek art, have been found in tombs, some forming a series that creates, in effect, a portable wall-painting. The "Boccanera" tomb at the Banditaccia necropolis at Cerveteri contained five panels almost a metre high set around the wall, which are now in the British Museum. Three of them form a single scene, apparently the Judgement of Paris, while the other two flanked the inside of the entrance, with sphinxes acting as tomb guardians. They date to about 560 BC. Fragments of similar panels have been found in city centre sites, presumably from temples, elite houses and other buildings, where the subjects include scenes of everyday life.

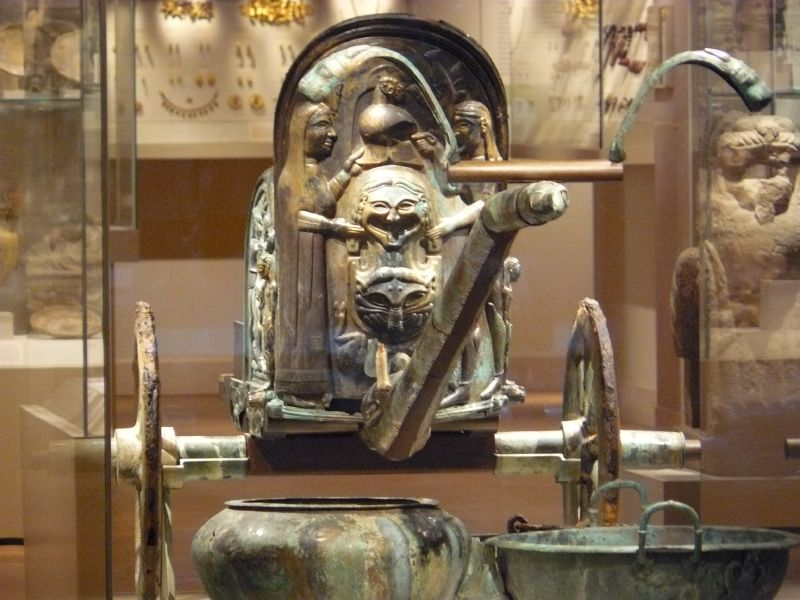
Monteleone bronze chariot inlaid with ivory (530 BC)

== Metalwork ==
The Etruscans were masters of bronze-working, as shown by the many outstanding examples in museums, and from accounts of the statues sent to Rome after their conquest. According to Pliny, the Romans looted 2,000 bronze statues from the city of Volsinii alone after capturing it.

The Monteleone chariot is one of the finest examples of large bronzework and is the best-preserved and most complete of the surviving works.

The Etruscans had a strong tradition of working in bronze from very early times, and their small bronzes were widely exported. Apart from cast bronze, the Etruscans were also skilled at the engraving of cast pieces with complex linear images, whose lines were filled with a white material to highlight them; in modern museum conditions, with this filling lost, and the surface inevitably somewhat degraded, they are often much less striking and harder to read than would have been the case originally. This technique was mostly applied to the roundish backs of polished bronze mirrors and to the sides of cistae. A major centre for cista manufacture was Praeneste, which, somewhat like early Rome, was an Italic-speaking town in the Etruscan cultural sphere. Some mirrors, or mirror covers (used to protect the mirror's reflective surface), are in a low relief.

== Funerary art ==
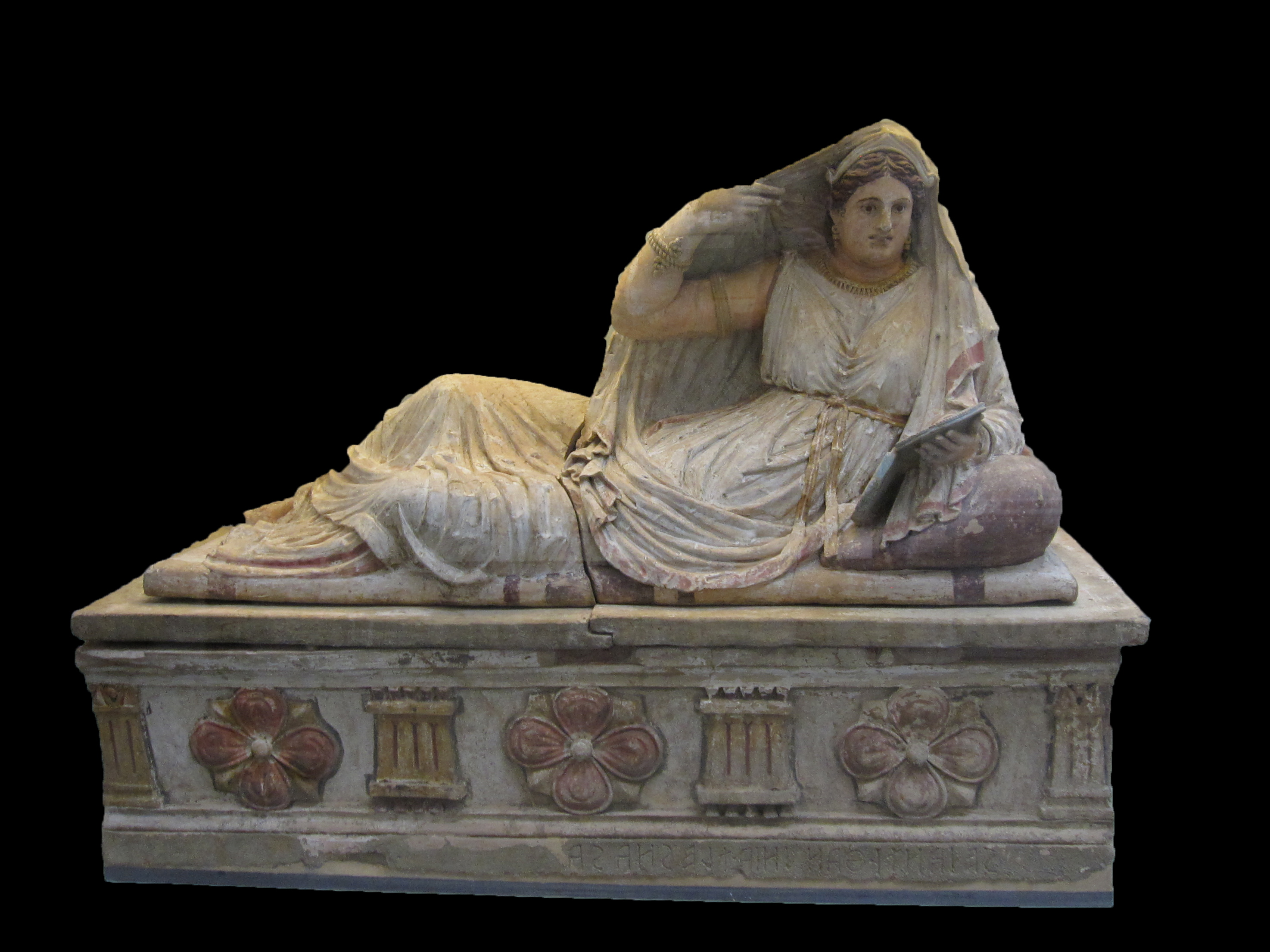
Painted terracotta Sarcophagus of Seianti Hanunia Tlesnasa, about 150–130 BCE

The Etruscans excelled in portraying humans. Throughout their history, they used two sets of burial practices: cremation and inhumation. Cinerary urns (for cremation) and sarcophagi (for inhumation) have been found together in the same tomb, showing that throughout generations, both forms were used at the same time. In the 7th century, they started depicting human heads on canopic urns, and when they started burying their dead in the late 6th century, they did so in terracotta sarcophagi. These sarcophagi were decorated with an image of the deceased reclining on the lid alone or sometimes with a spouse. The Etruscans invented the custom of placing figures on the lid, which later influenced the Romans to do the same. Funerary urns that were like miniature versions of the sarcophagi, with a reclining figure on the lid, became widely popular in Etruria.

The Hellenistic period funerary urns were generally made in two pieces. The top lid usually depicted a banqueting man or woman (but not always), and the container part was either decorated in relief in the front only or, on more elaborate stone pieces, carved on its sides. During this period, the terracotta urns were being mass-produced using clay in Northern Etruria (specifically in and around Chiusi). Often the scenes decorated in relief on the front of the urn were depicting generic Greek influenced scenes. The production of these urns did not require skilled artists, and so what we are left with is often mediocre, unprofessional art, made en masse. However, the colour choices on the urns offer evidence as to dating, as colours used changed over time.

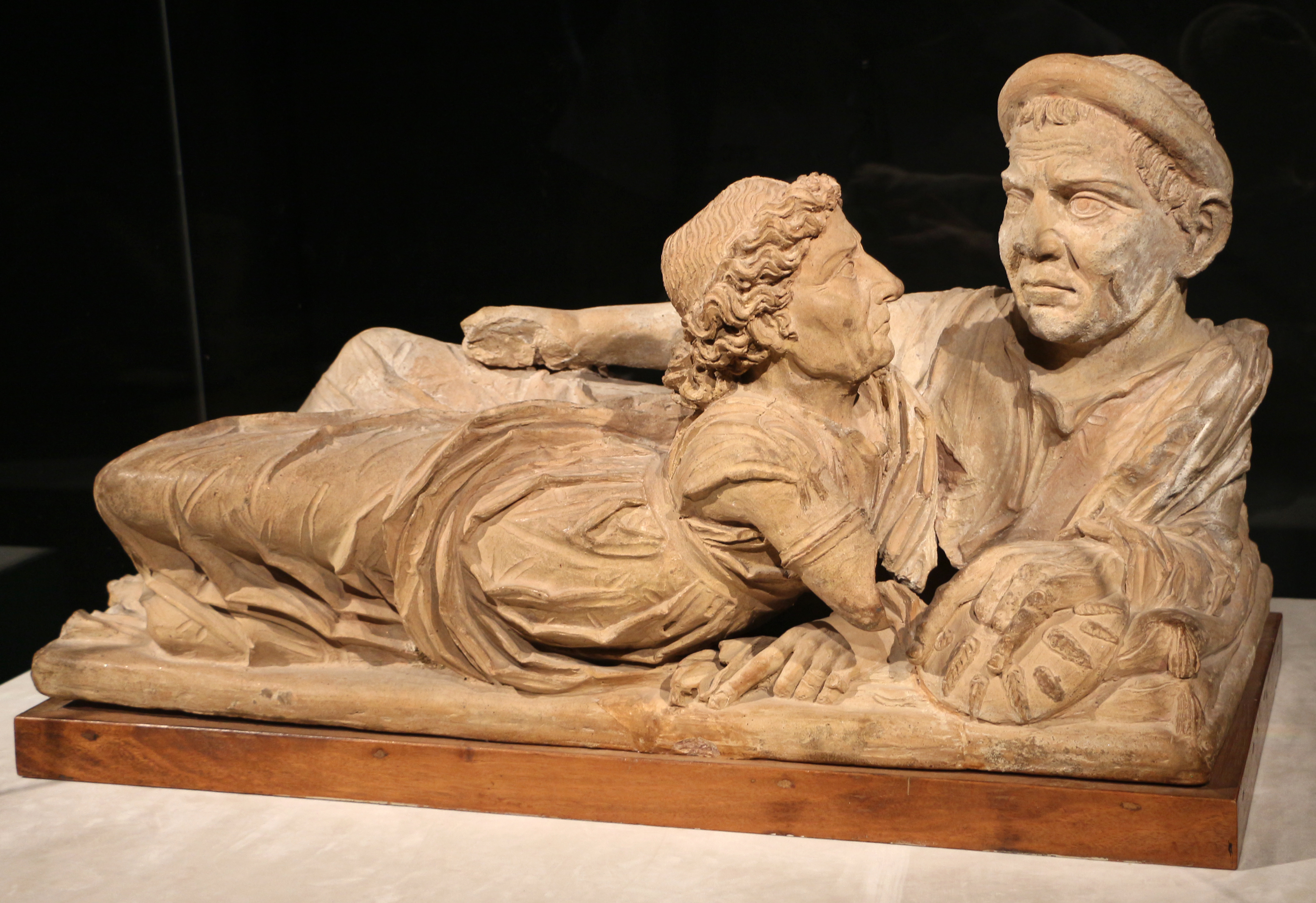
Urn of the Husband and Wife (no. 613), 1st century BC, from Volterra, Etruscan Museum Mario Guarnacci

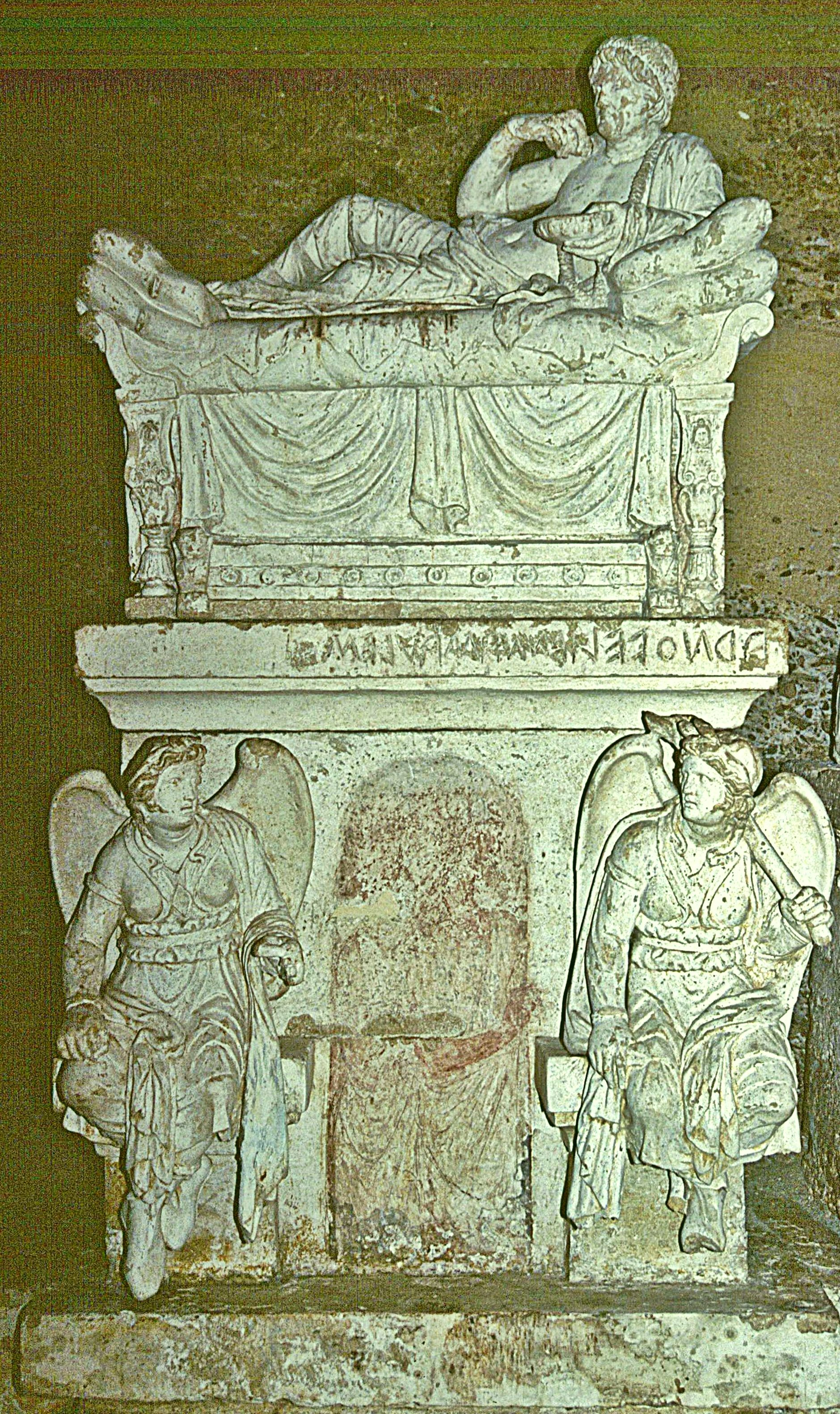
Hypogeum of the Volumnus family, from an Etruscan tomb outside Perugia, 3rd century BC

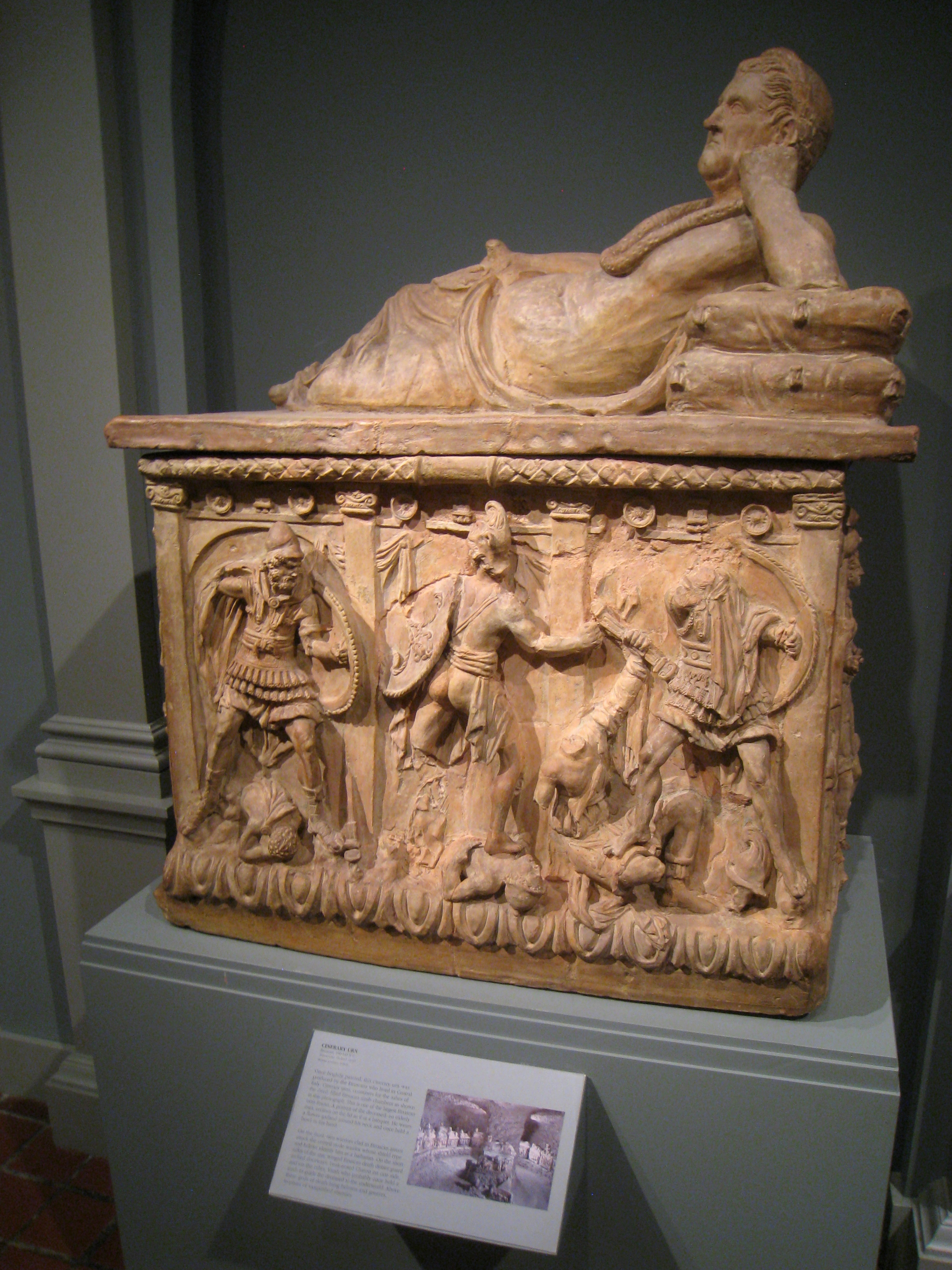
Etruscan Cinerary Urn, mid-2nd century BC, terracotta – Worcester Art Museum

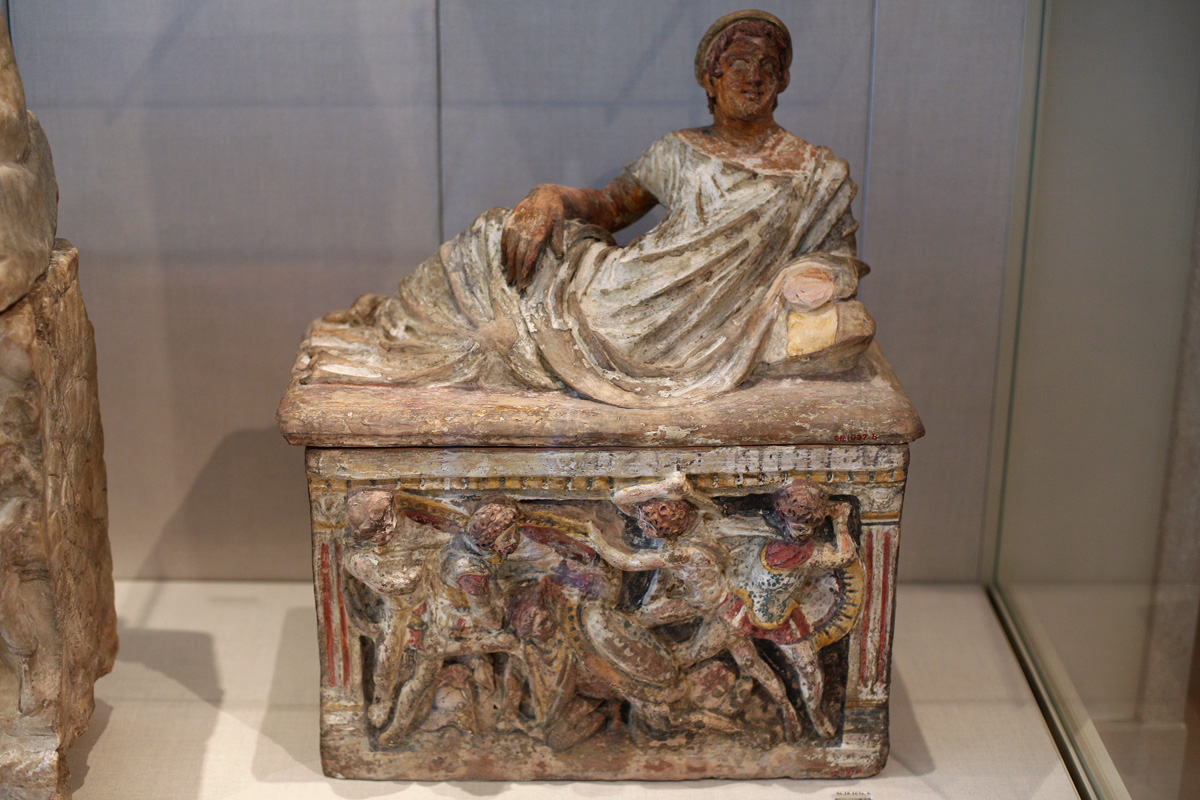
MMA Etruscan Funerary Urn

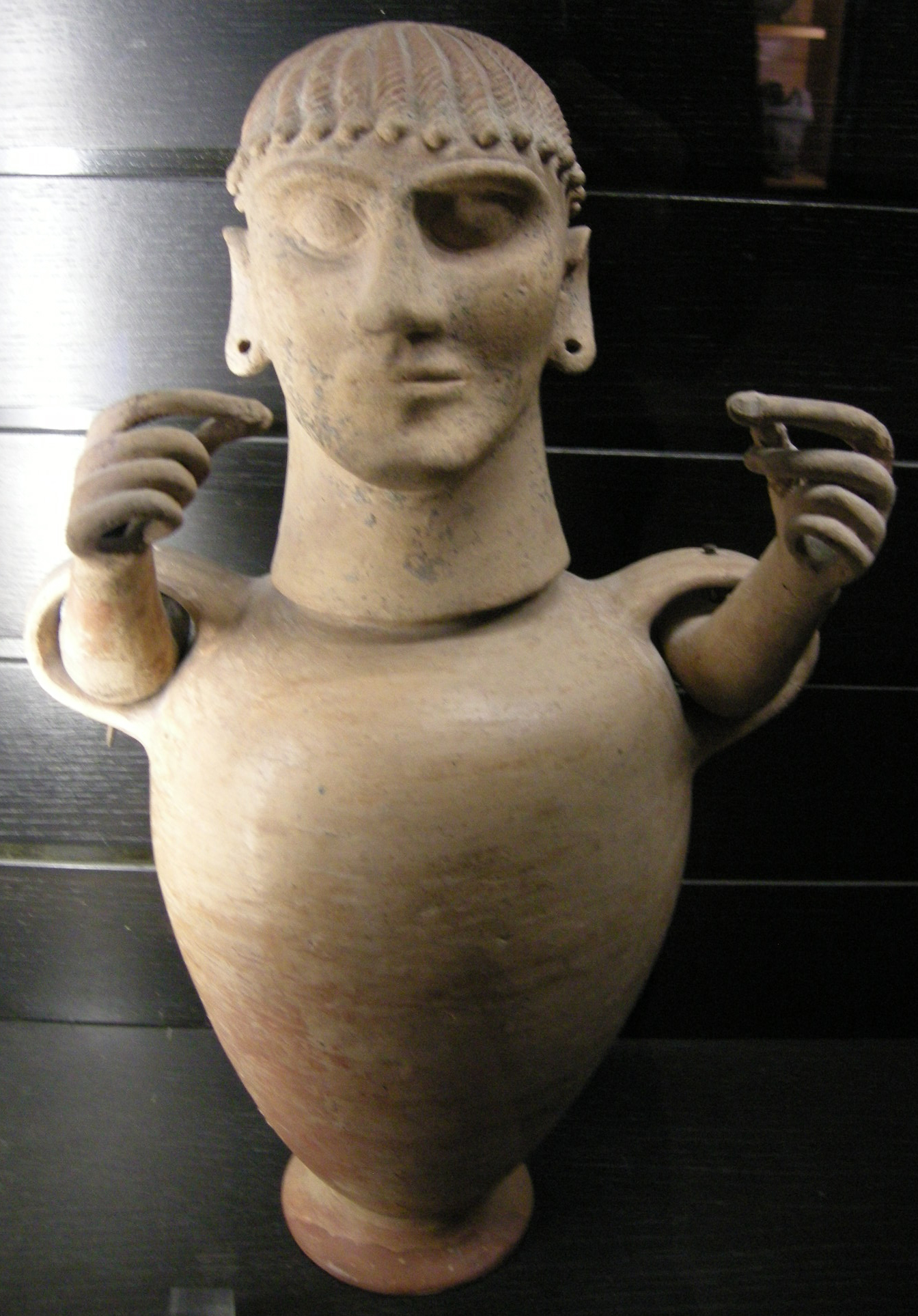
Etruscan Canopic Urn from Chiusi

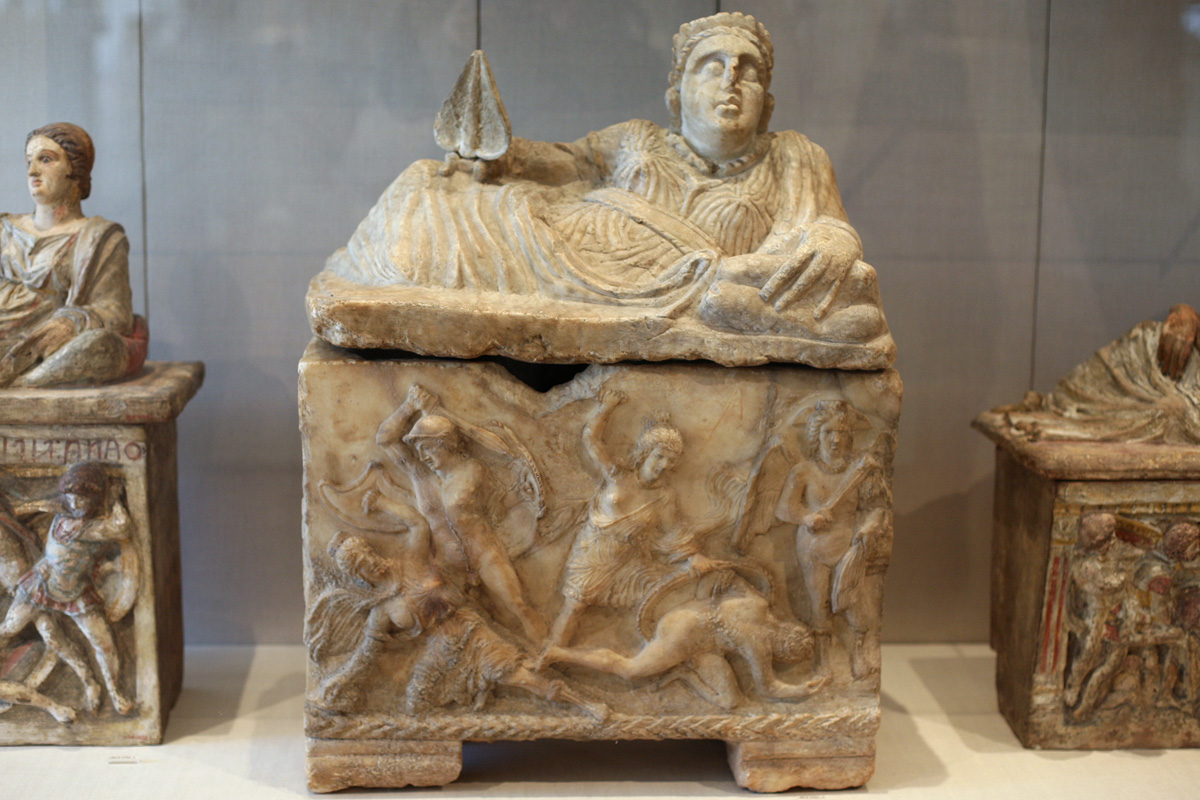
Funerary Urn

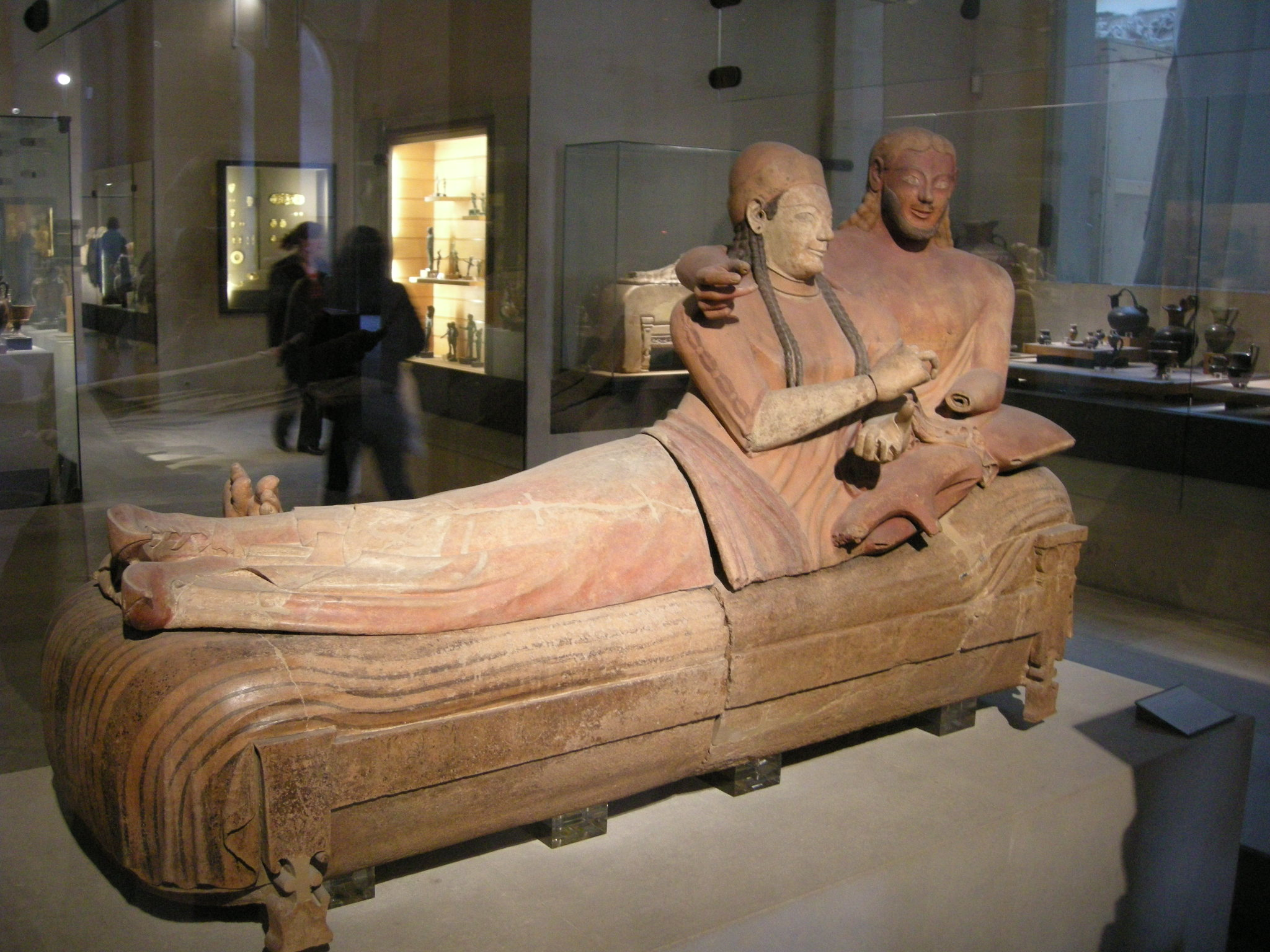
Louvre, Sarcophagus of the Spouses, Cerveteri, 520BCE

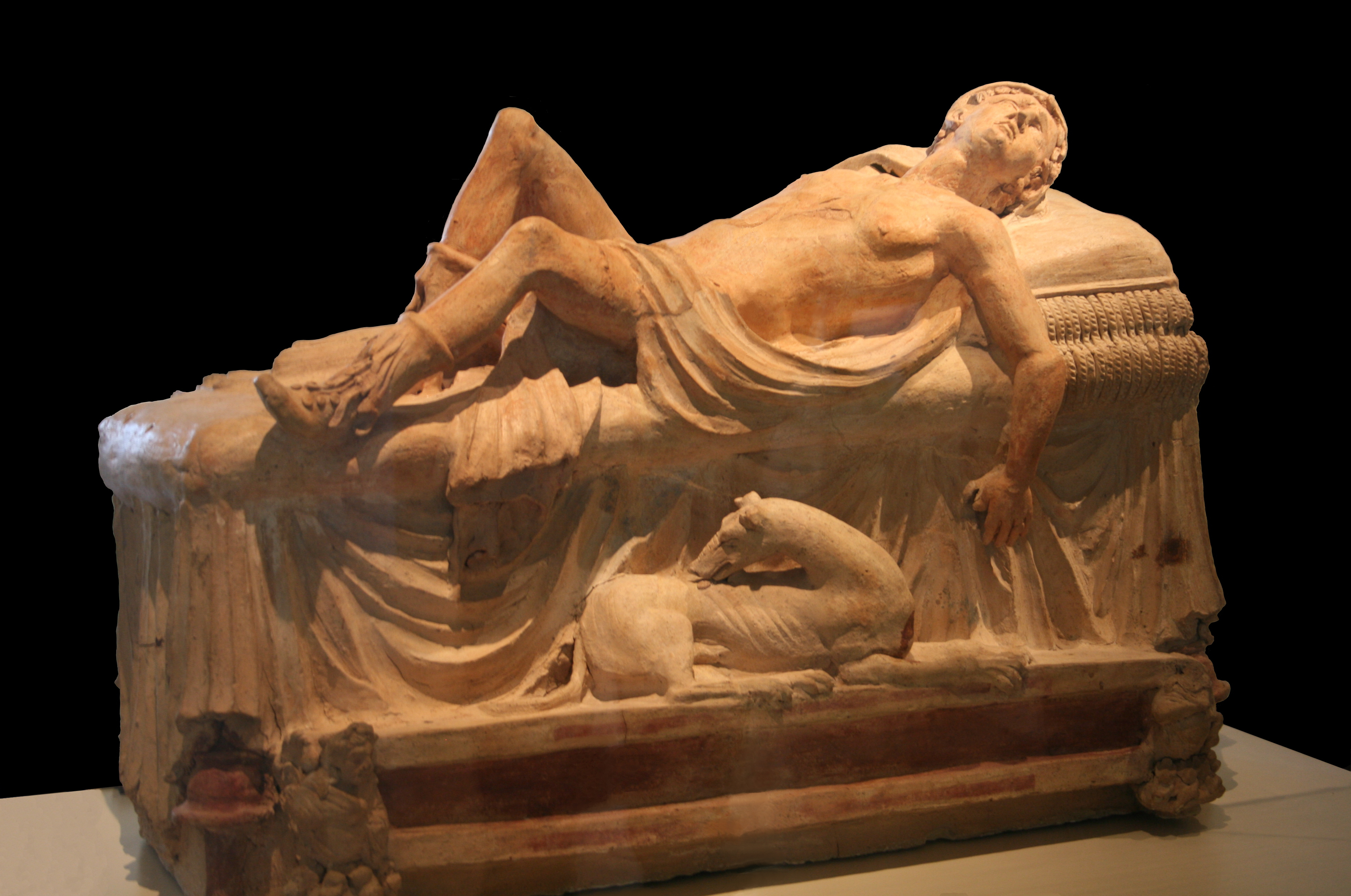
Sepulchral monument of a dying Adonis, polychrome terracotta, Etruscan art from Tuscana, 250–100 BC

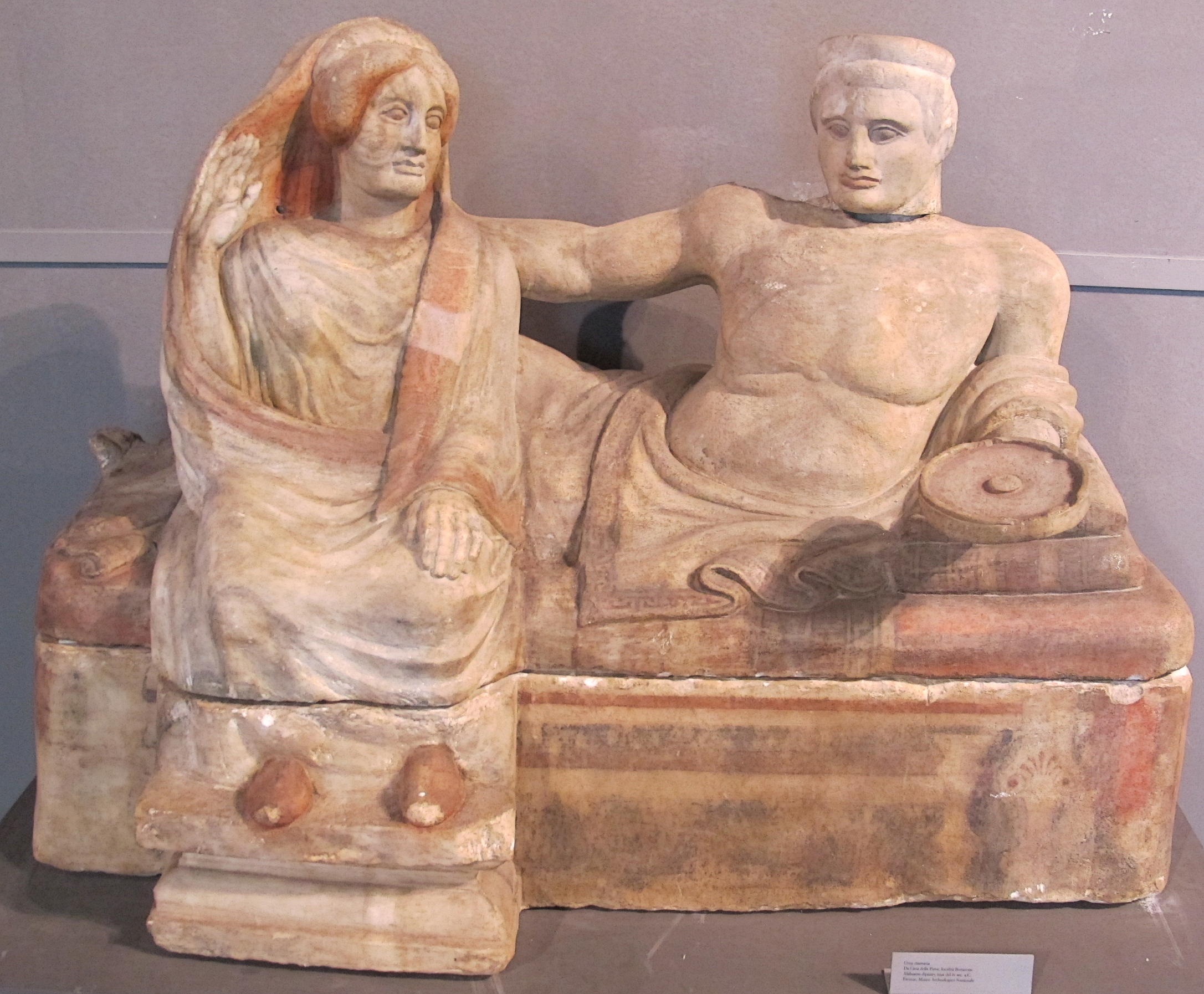
A funerary urn with sculpture of a couple, from Bottarone, alabaster, early 4th century BC

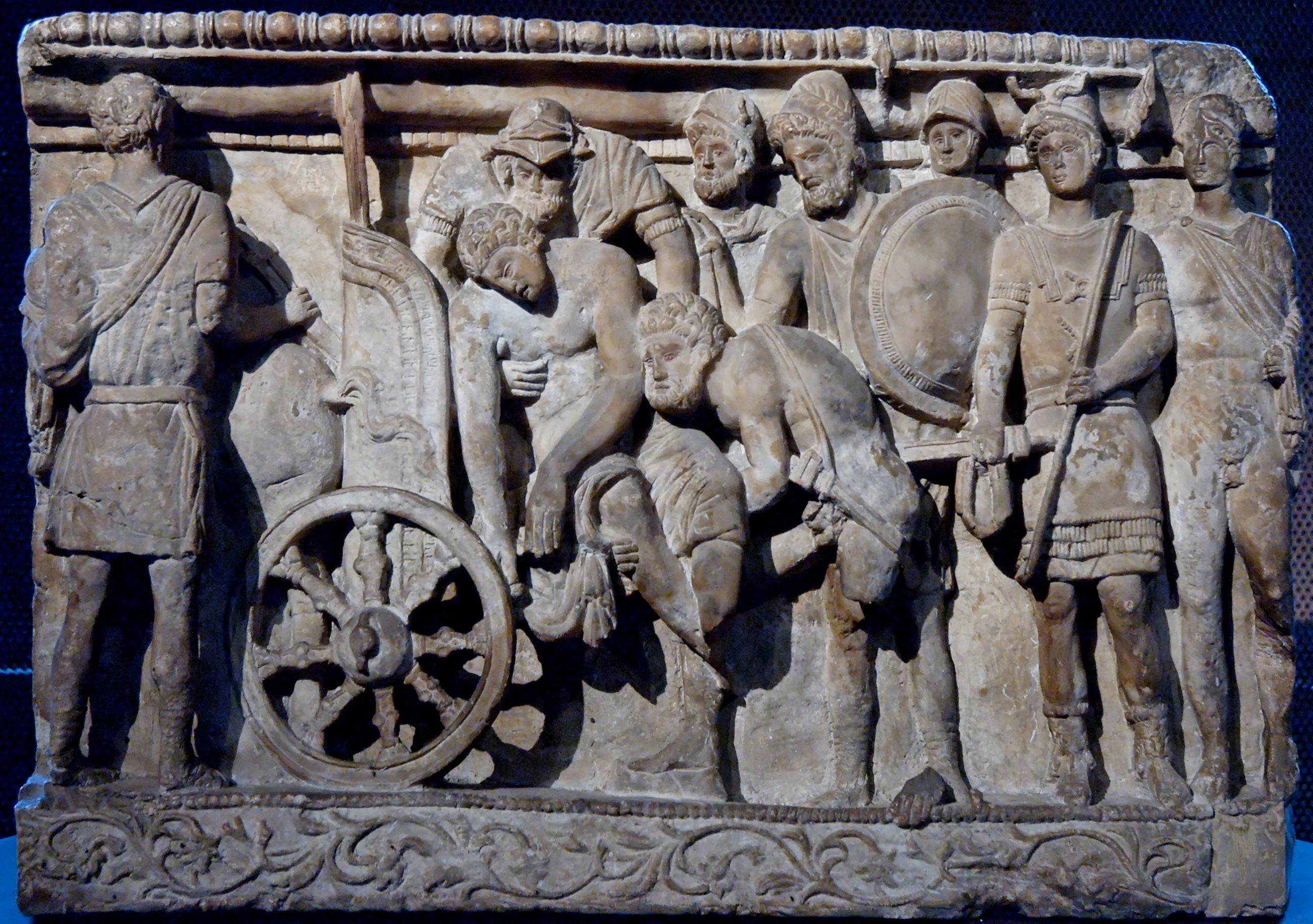
Menelaus and Meriones lifting Patroclus' corpse on a cart while Odysseus looks on; alabaster urn, Etruscan artwork from Volterra, 2nd century BC

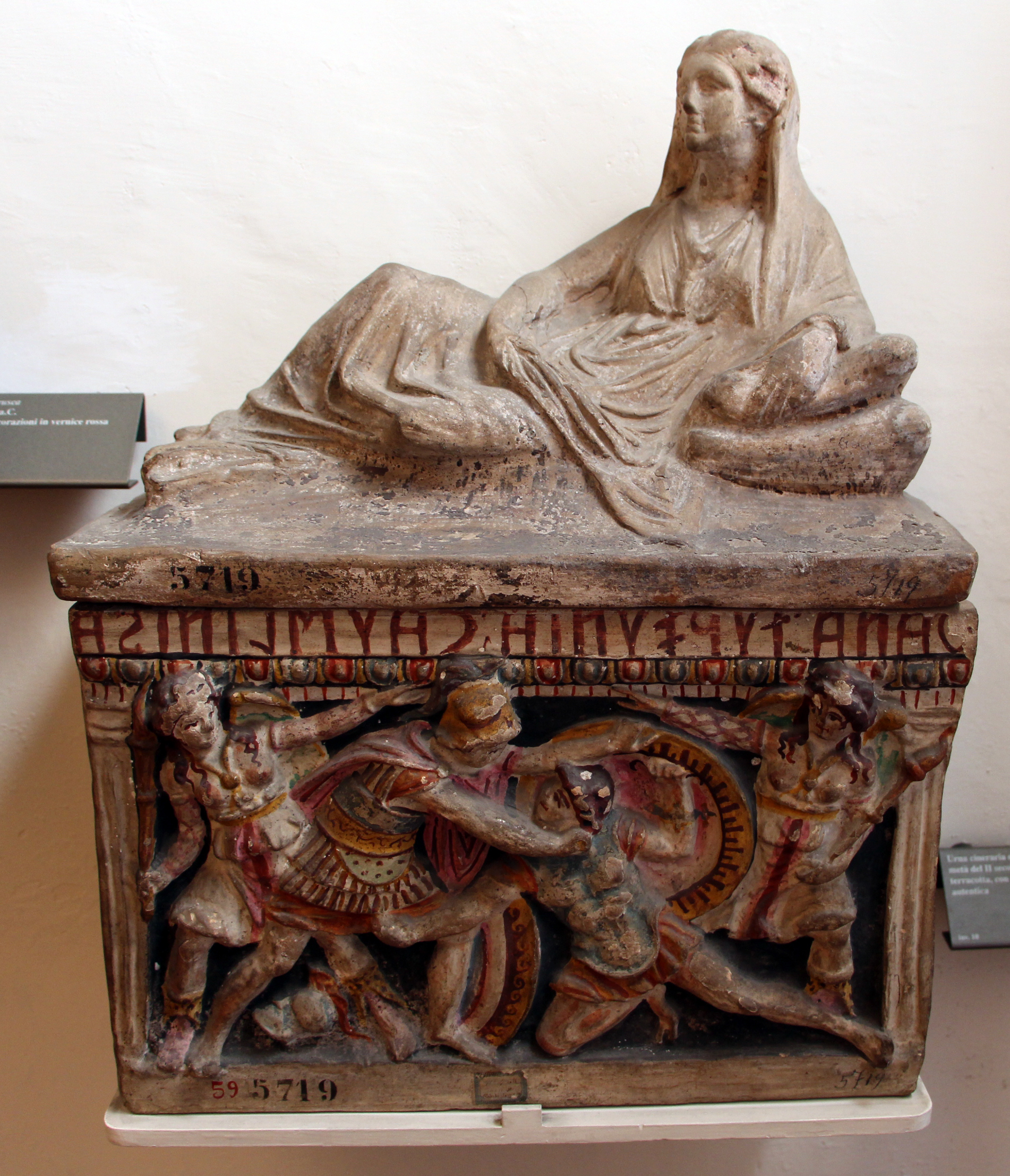
Etruscan funerary urn crowned with the sculpture of a woman and a front-panel relief showing two warriors fighting, polychrome terracotta, c. 150 BC

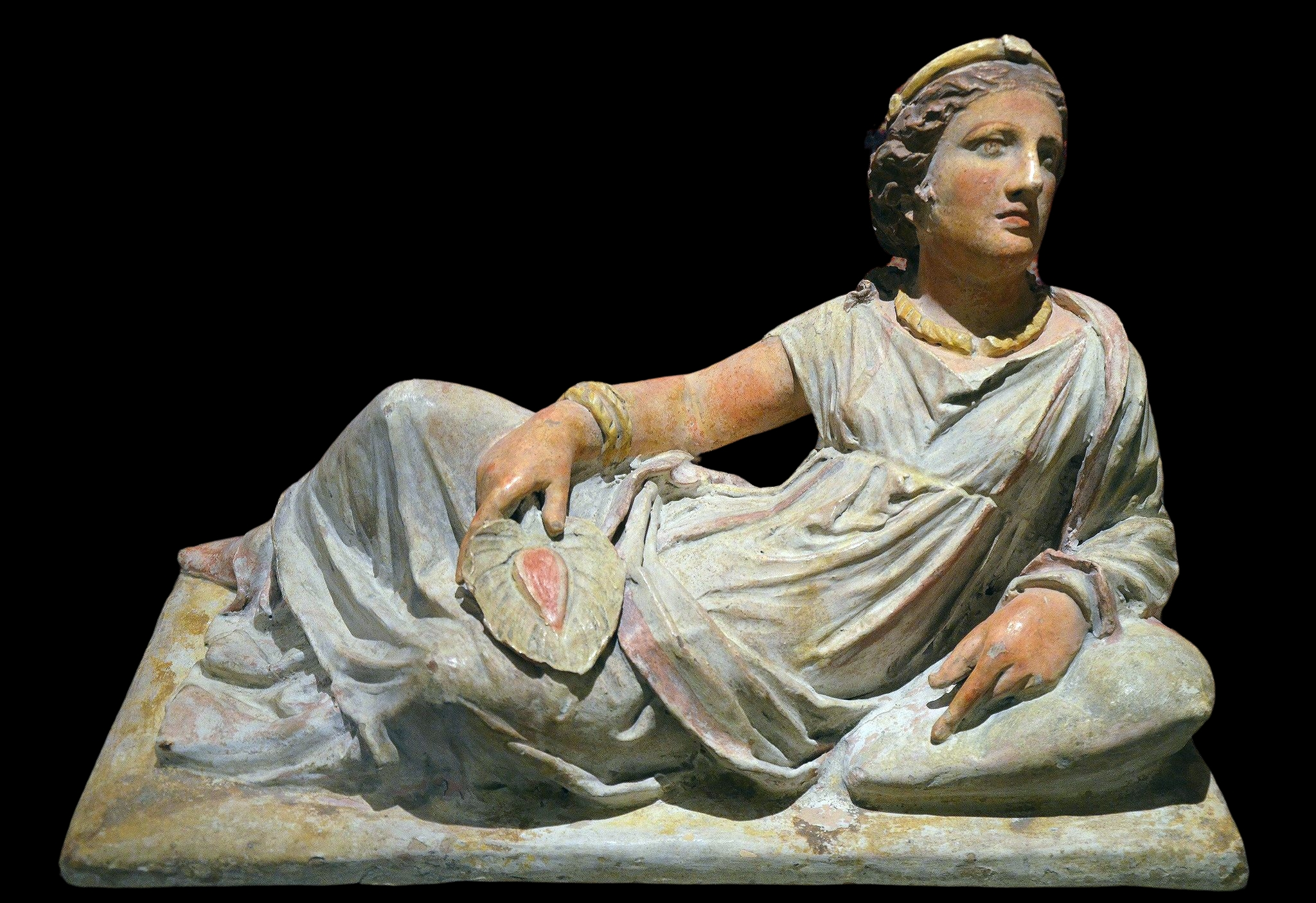
Sarcophagus from Chiusi

== Art and religion ==
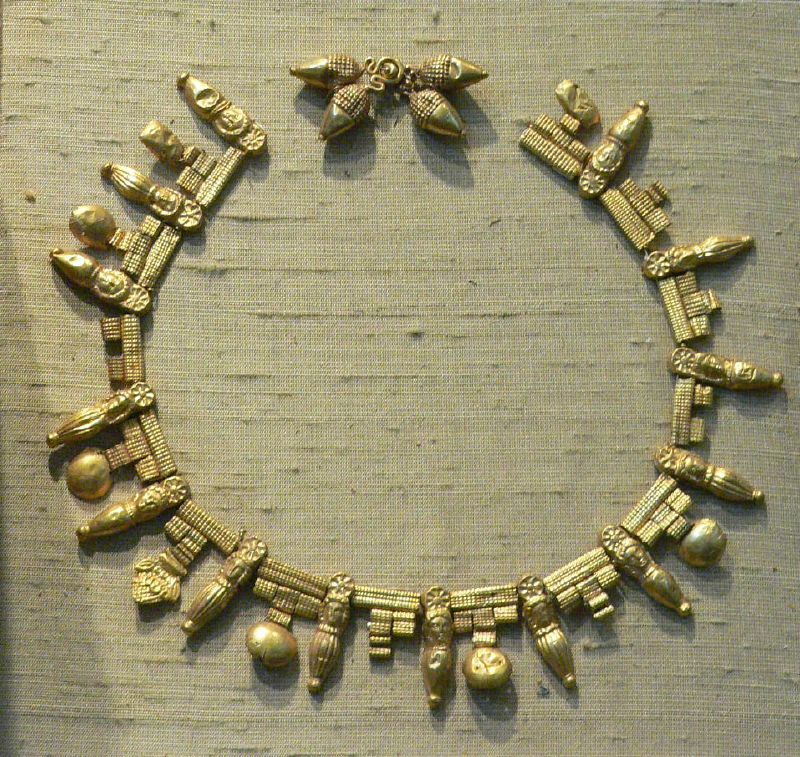
5th to 4th century BC necklace in gold

Etruscan art was often religious in character and, hence, strongly connected to the requirements of Etruscan religion. The Etruscan afterlife was negative, in contrast to the positive view in ancient Egypt where it was but a continuation of earthly life, or the confident relations with the gods as in ancient Greece. Roman interest in Etruscan religion centred on their methods of divination and propitiating and discovering the will of the gods, rather than the gods themselves, which may have distorted the information that has come down to us. Most remains of Etruscan funerary art have been found in excavations of cemeteries (as at Cerveteri, Tarquinia, Populonia, Orvieto, Vetulonia, Norchia), meaning that what we see of Etruscan art is primarily dominated by depictions of religion and in particular the funerary cult, whether or not that is a true reflection of Etruscan art as a whole.

== Museums ==
Etruscan tombs were heavily looted from early on, initially for precious metals. From the Renaissance onwards, Etruscan objects, especially painted vases and sarcophagi, were keenly collected. Many were exported before this was forbidden, and most major museum collections of classical art around the world have good selections. But the major collections remain in Italian museums in Rome, Florence, and other cities in areas that were formerly Etruscan, which include the results of modern archaeology.

Major collections in Italy include the National Etruscan Museum (Italian: Museo Nazionale Etrusco) in the Villa Giulia in Rome, National Archaeological Museum in Florence, Vatican Museums, Tarquinia National Museum, and the Archeological Civic Museum in Bologna, as well as more local collections near important sites such as Cerveteri, Orvieto and Perugia. Some painted tombs, now emptied of their contents, can be viewed at necropoli such as Cerveteri.

From 2021-2022, there was a major exhibition of Etruscan art at the MARQ Archaeological Museum of Alicante, Spain. The exhibition, Etruscans: The Dawn of Rome, featured a large number of items on loan from the National Archaeological Museum, Florence and the Guarnacci Etruscan Museum in Volterra.

== Gallery ==
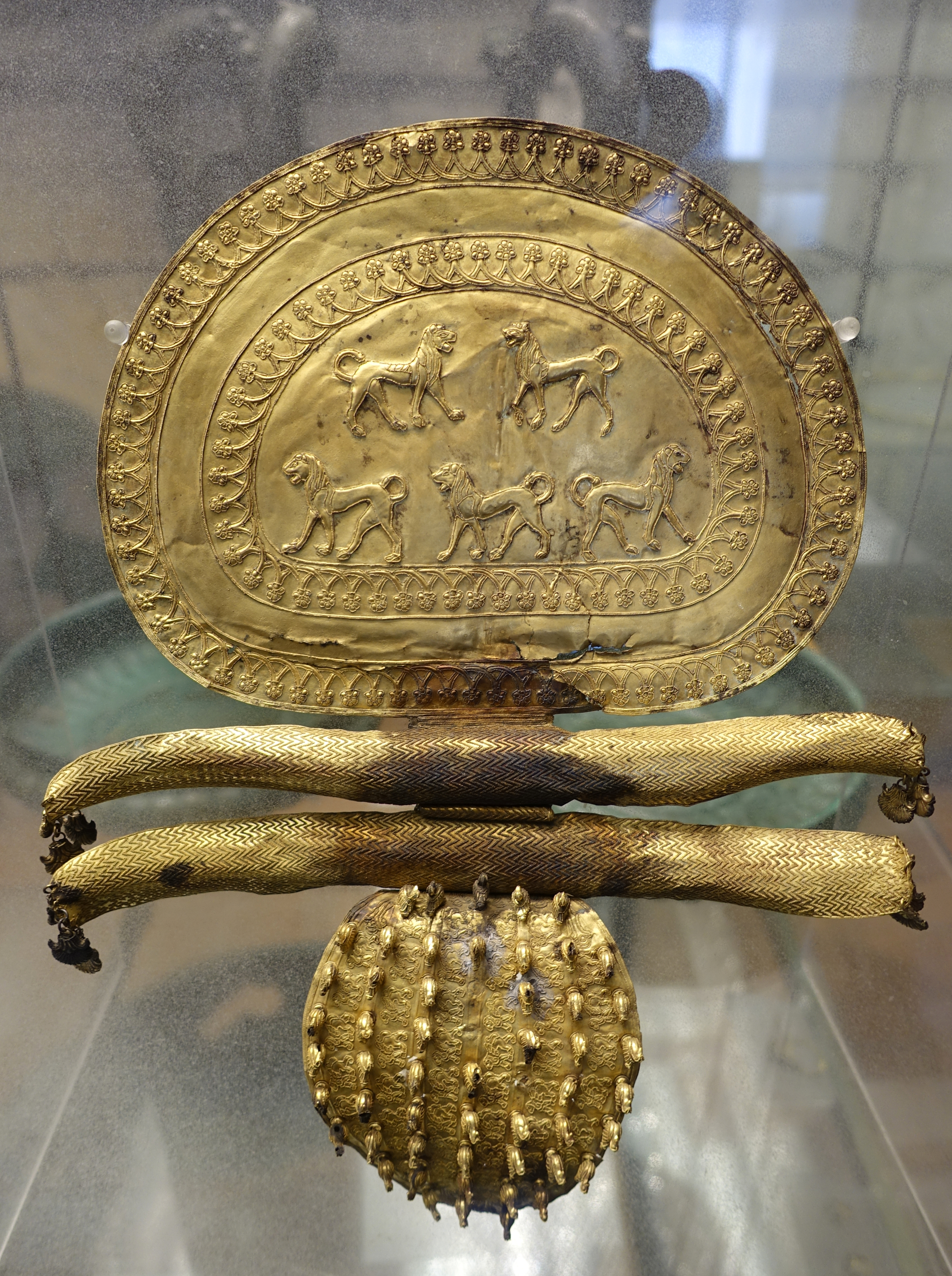
Gold disc brooch, Cerveteri, 675–650 BC

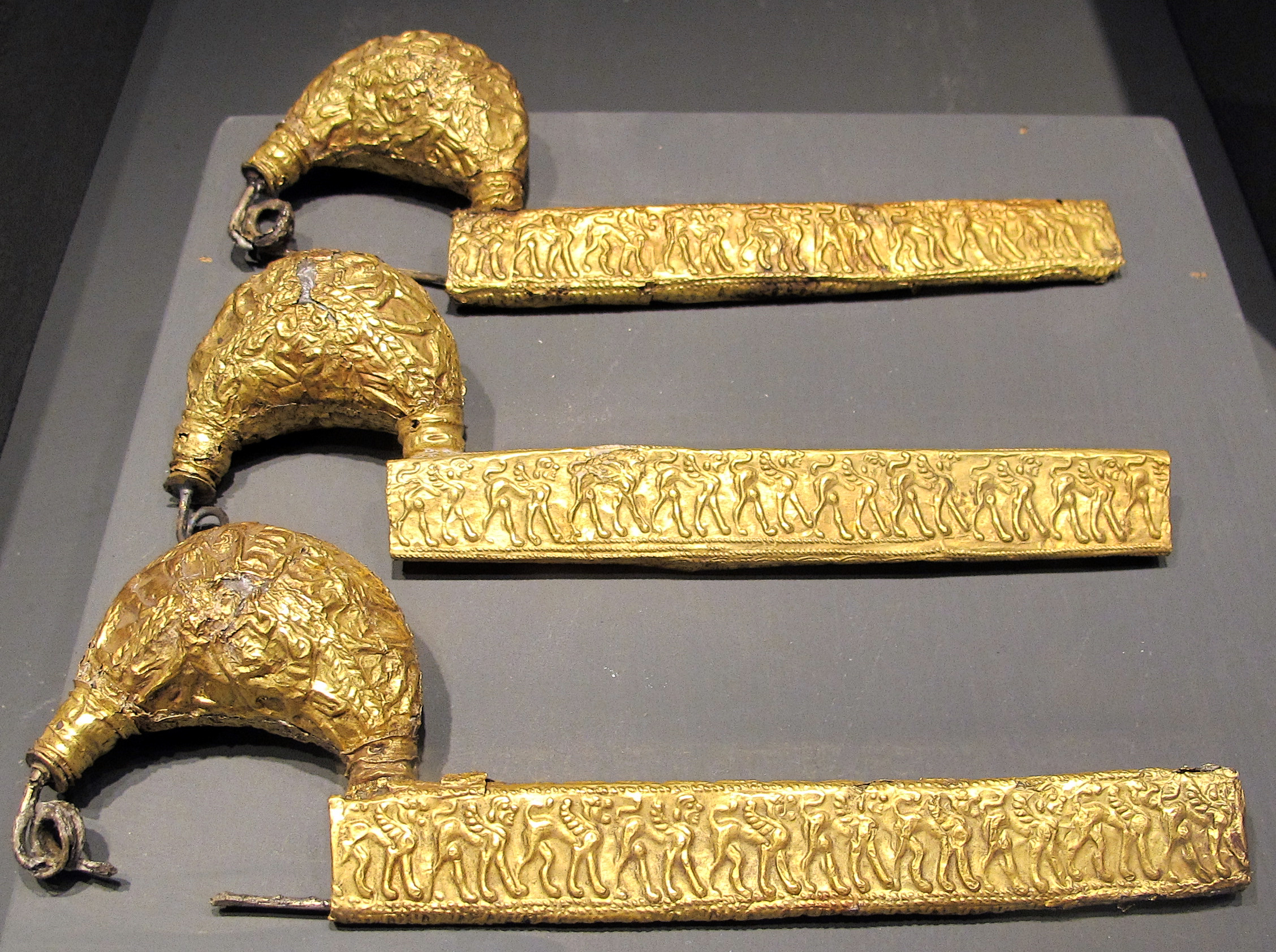
Gold brooches

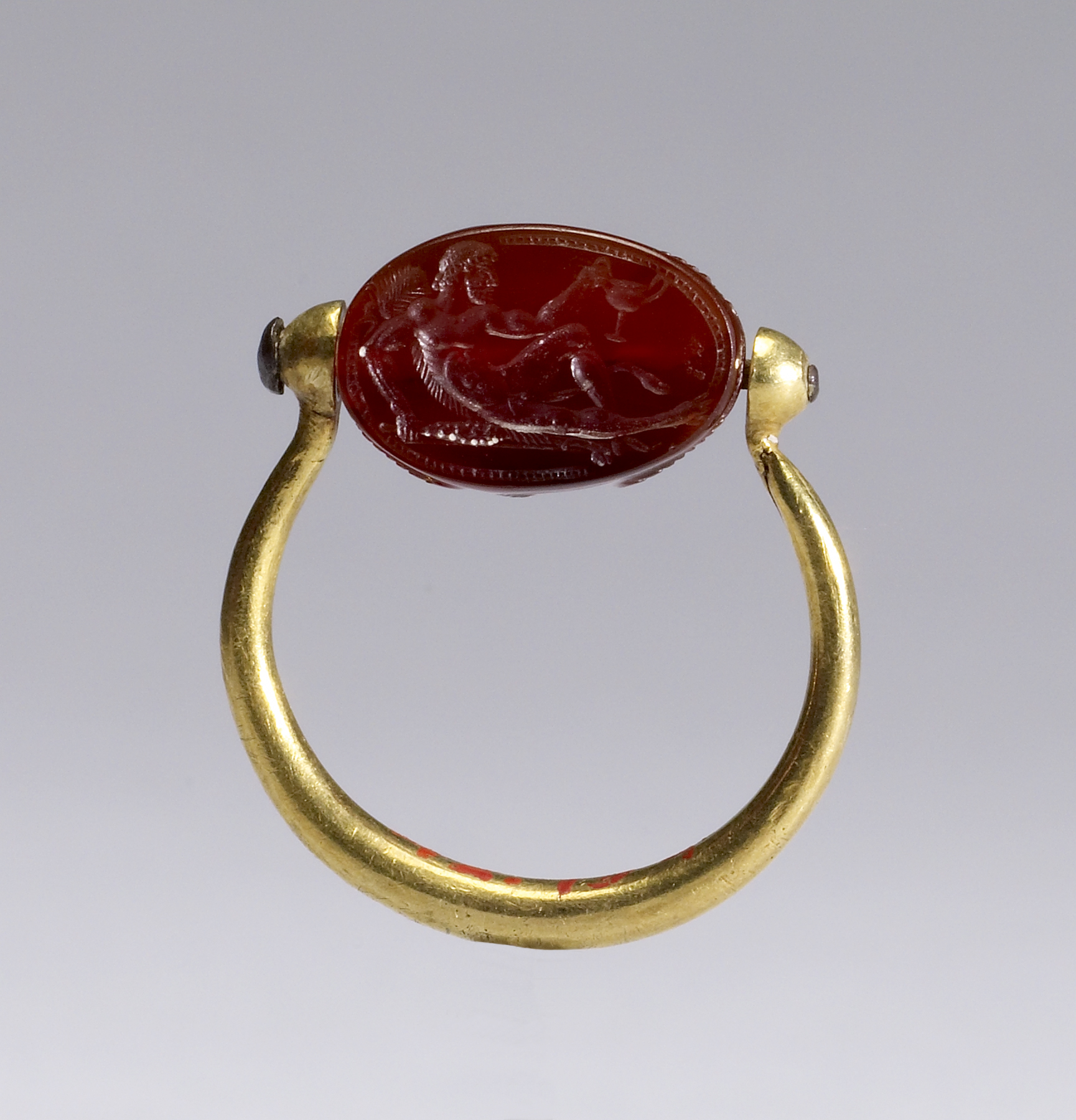
Gem with Herakles at Rest

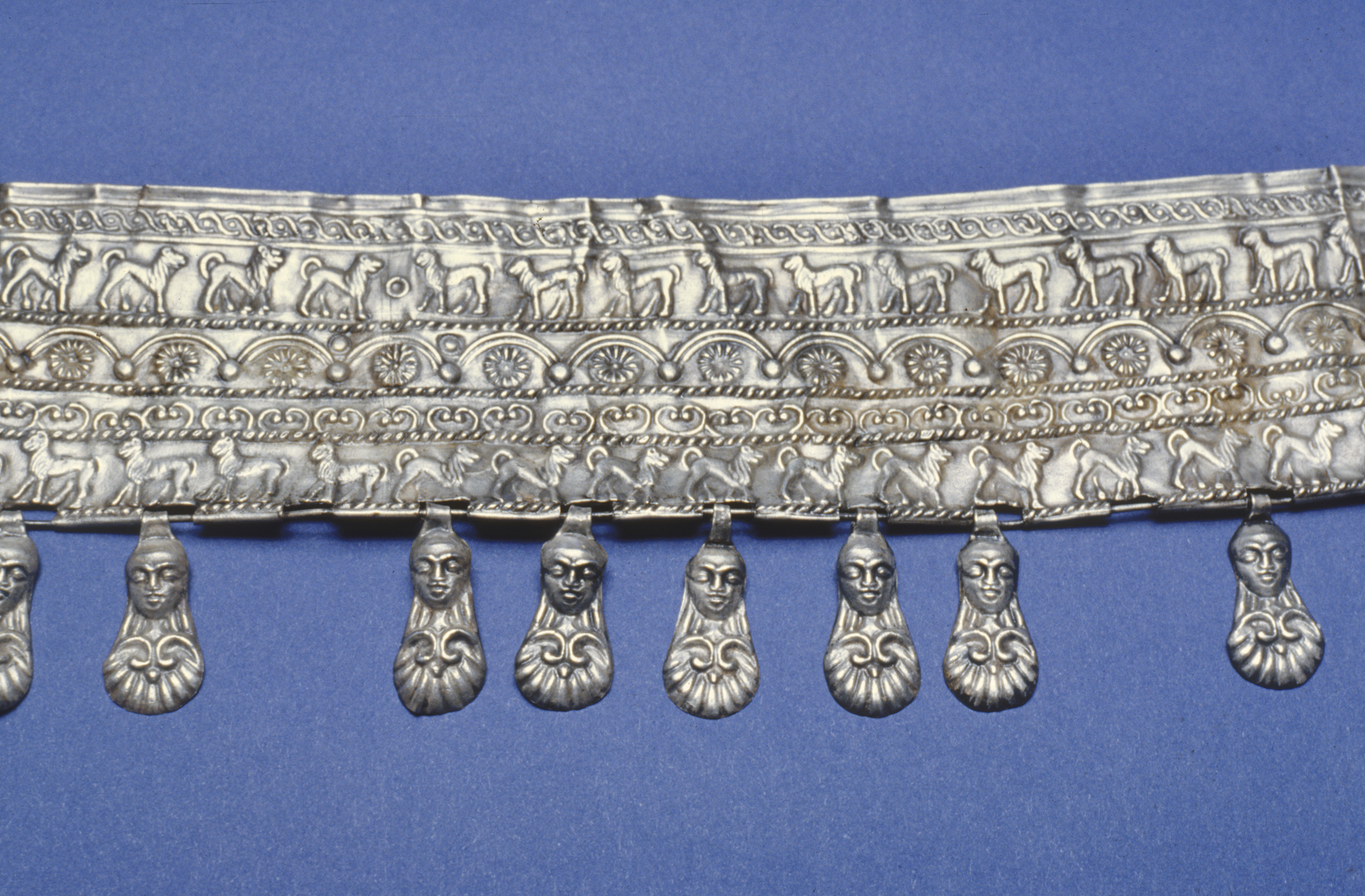
Breast Ornament (?)

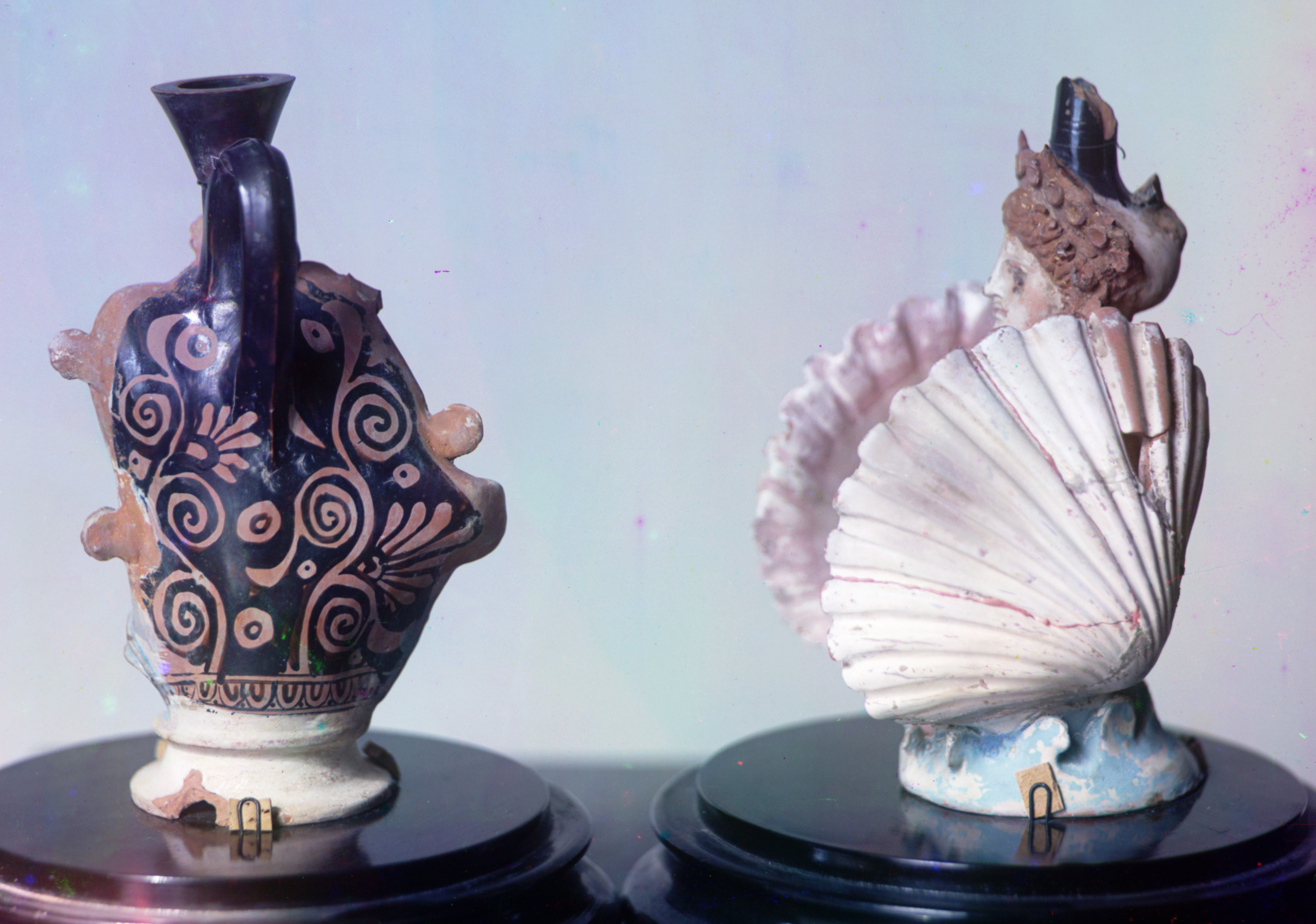
Ancient Etruscan "aryballoi" terracota vessels found in Bolzhaya Bliznitsa tumulus near Phanagoria, South Russia (then part of the Bosporan Kingdom of Cimmerian Bosporus); Hermitage Museum, Saint Petersburg.

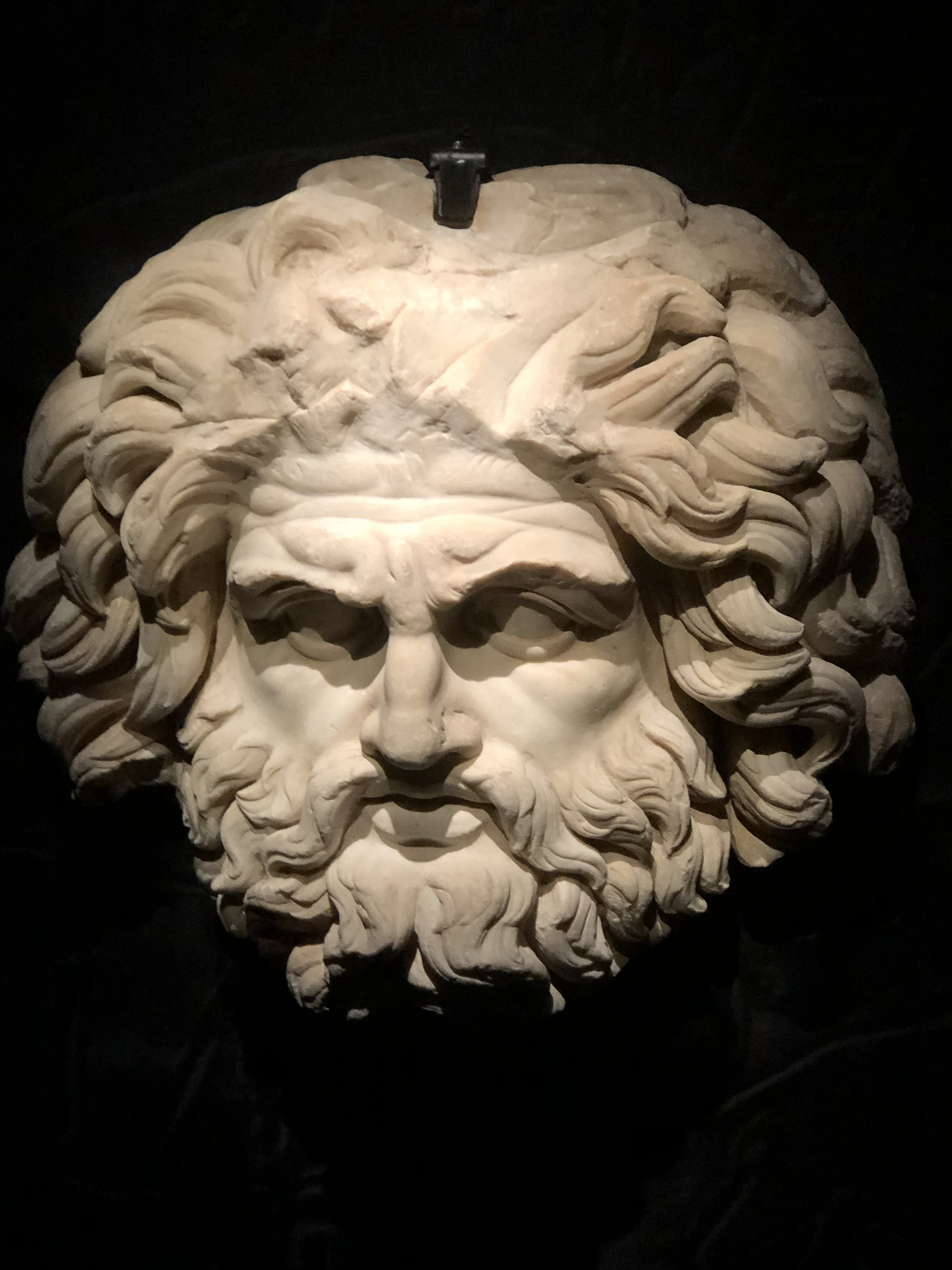
Head of a god - MARQ exhibition of Etruscan art - March 2022

== See also ==
- Etruscan architecture
- Isis Tomb, Vulci
- Ombra della sera
- Tomb of the Augurs
- Tomb of the Bulls
- Tomb of the Dancers
- Tomb of the Leopards
- Tomb of the Triclinium
