= Winged-Horses of Tarquinia =

Tarquinia Winged Horses
- Tarquínia Winged-Horses, exhibited at the Tarquinia National Museum

- Location in Tarquinia, Italy
- Artist: Unknown artist
- Year: Mid-4th century BC
- Type: High-relief sculpture
- Medium: Terracotta
- Subject: Winged horses from the temple of the Ara della Regina
- Condition: Preserved
- Location: Tarquinia National Museum, Tarquinia; 42°15′28″N 11°47′38″E

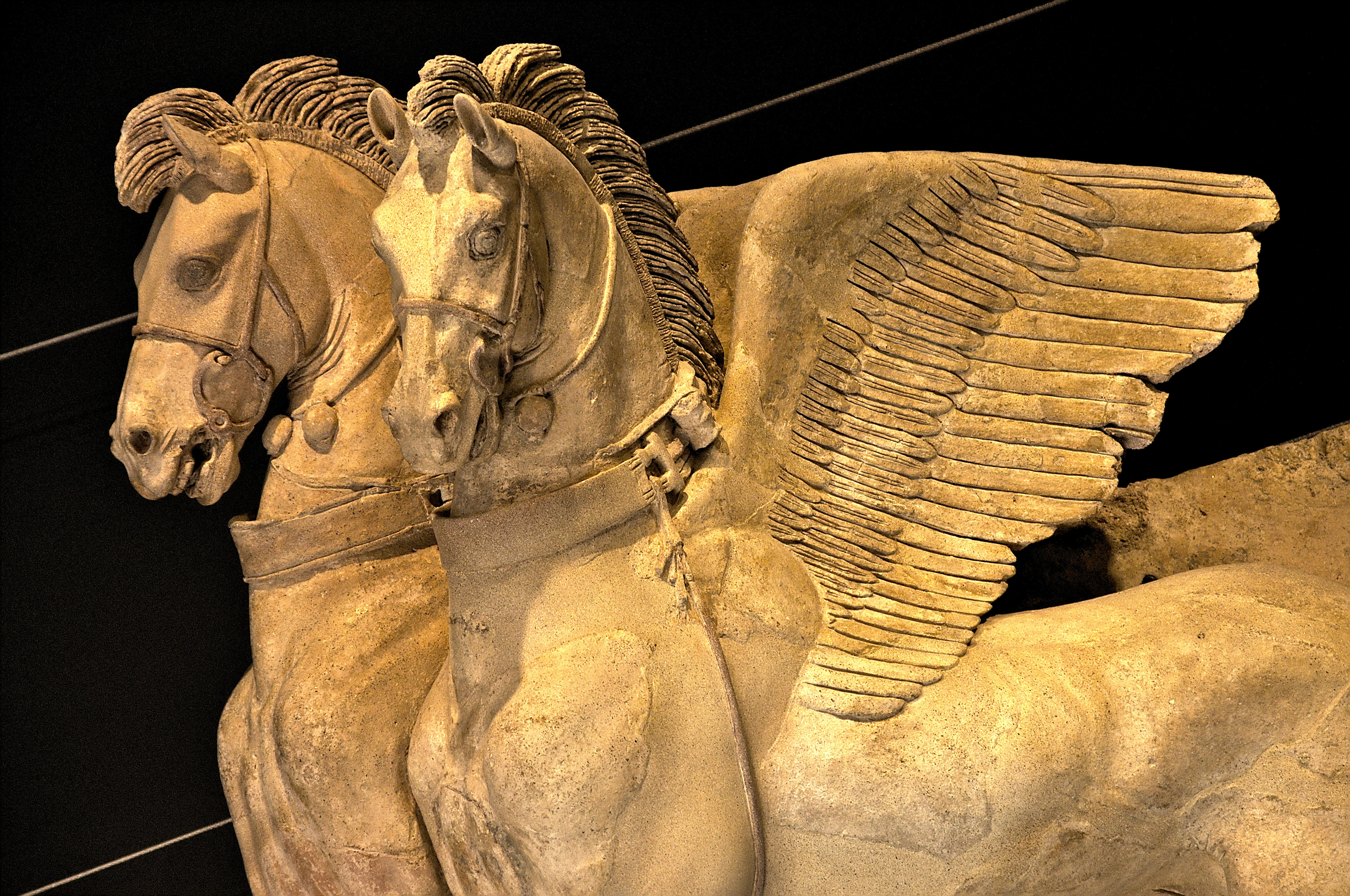
Detail

The high-relief of the "Tarquinia Winged Horses" is a fragment of the colonnade that supported the pediment of the most important temple of the ancient Etruscan city of Tarquínia, at the Ara della Regina, better known as the Major Temple of Tarquínia. Nowadays situated at the Province of Viterbo (region of Lazio, Italy).

== History ==
The Tarquinia Winged Horses are significant examples of Etruscan art, known for their craftsmanship and intricate design. These terracotta sculptures are believed to have adorned the monumental temple known as the Ara della Regina, which dates back to the 4th century BC. The temple underwent renovations in the 3rd century BC, enhancing its grandeur.

Its realization dates back to the middle of the 4th century BC, although some researchers argued that it could be more recent, because only after the 3rd century BC Etruscan builders gave the temples a particular change in the decoration of the friezes and pediments.

== Symbology ==
In spite of the stylistic influence of the classic Greek art, this set can not be identified with the only winged horse of Greek mythology, Pegasus, or with the horses that drew the car of Apollo. Therefore, it is a work of a purely decorative character, adapted to the Etruscan world. The image of winged horses has become the symbol and emblem of contemporary region of Tarquinia.

== Conservation ==
The relief is permanently exposed to the Tarquinia National Museum. It is part of an archaeological complex that began to work in the mid-twentieth century.

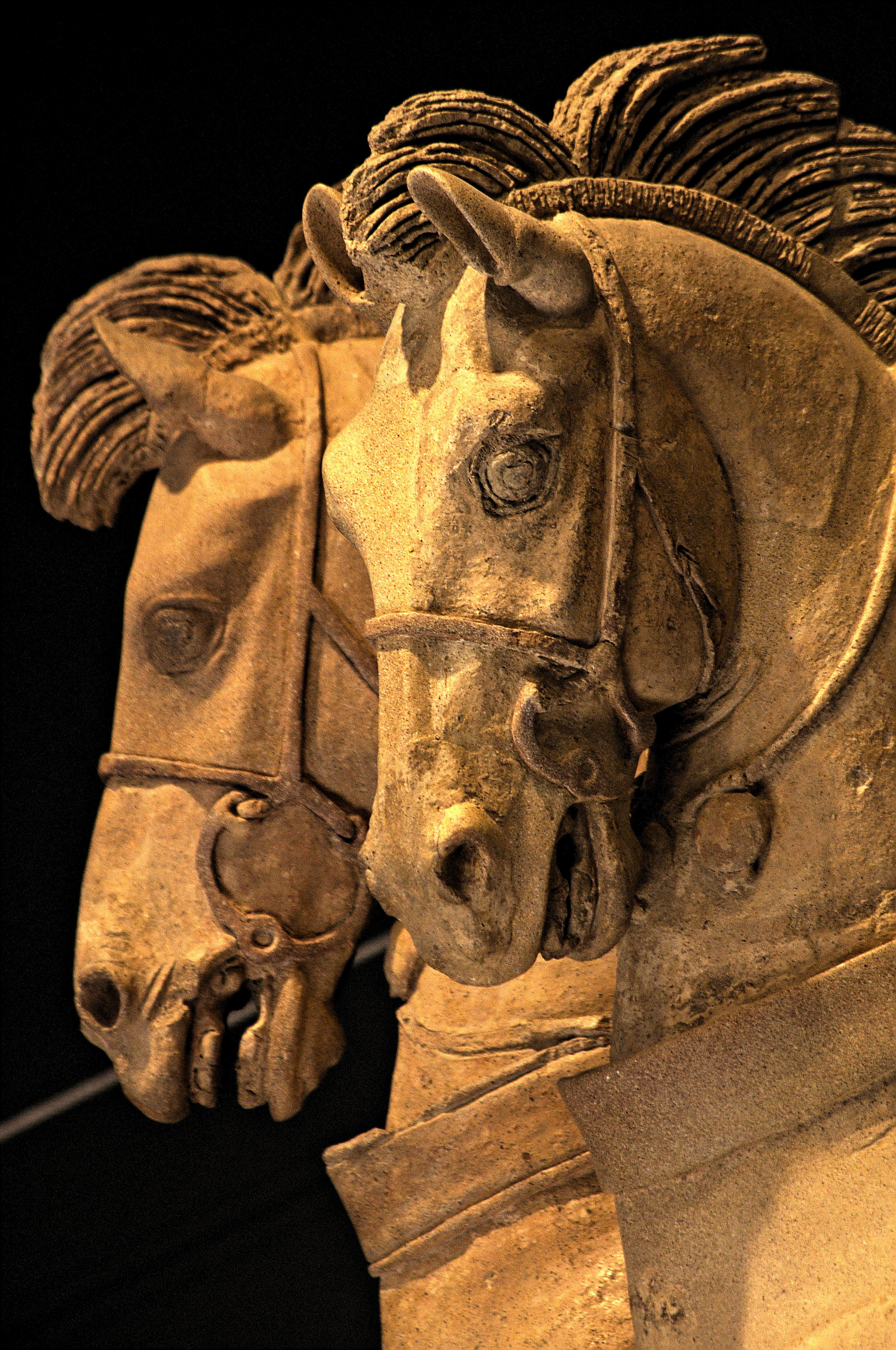

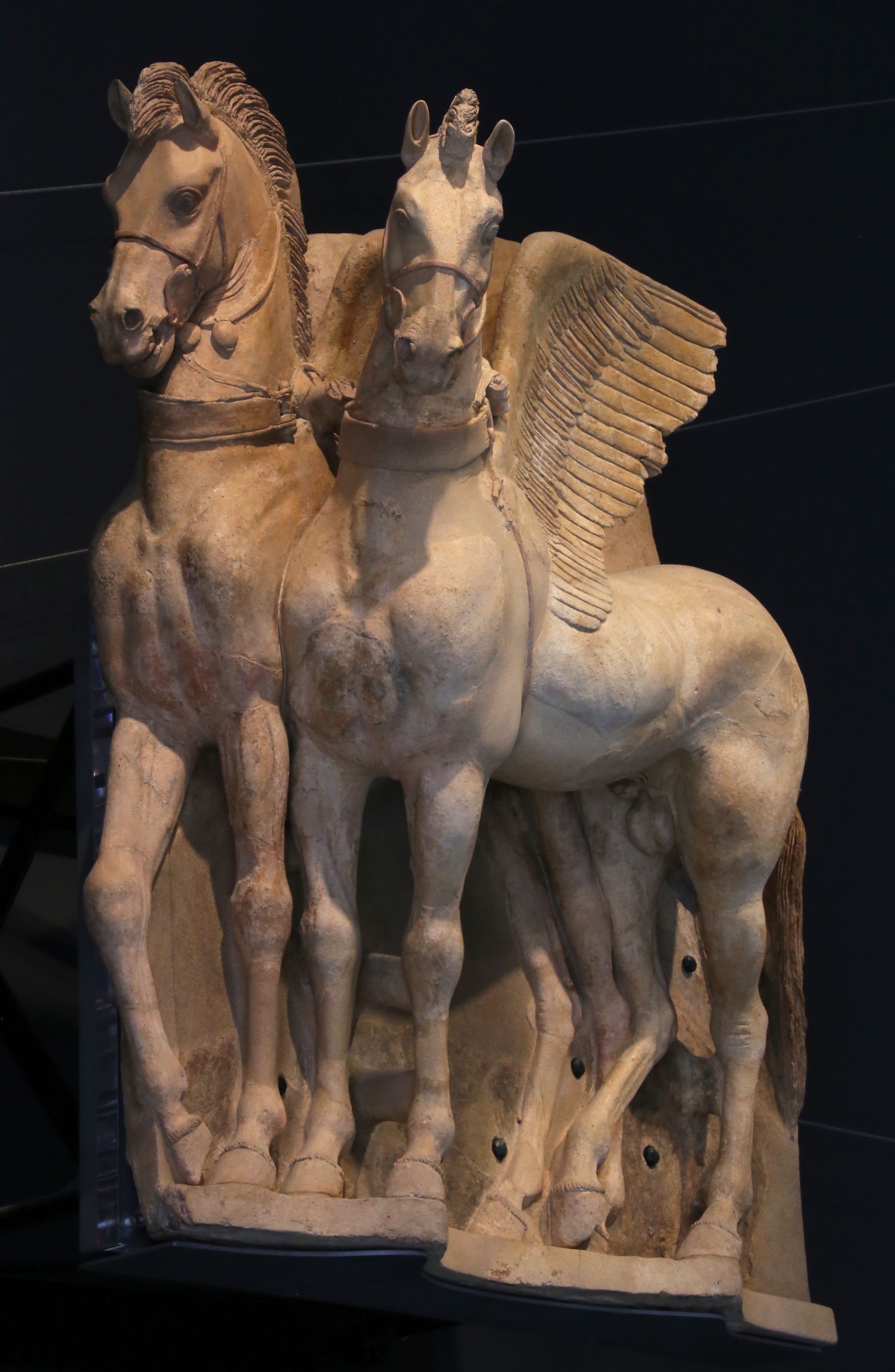

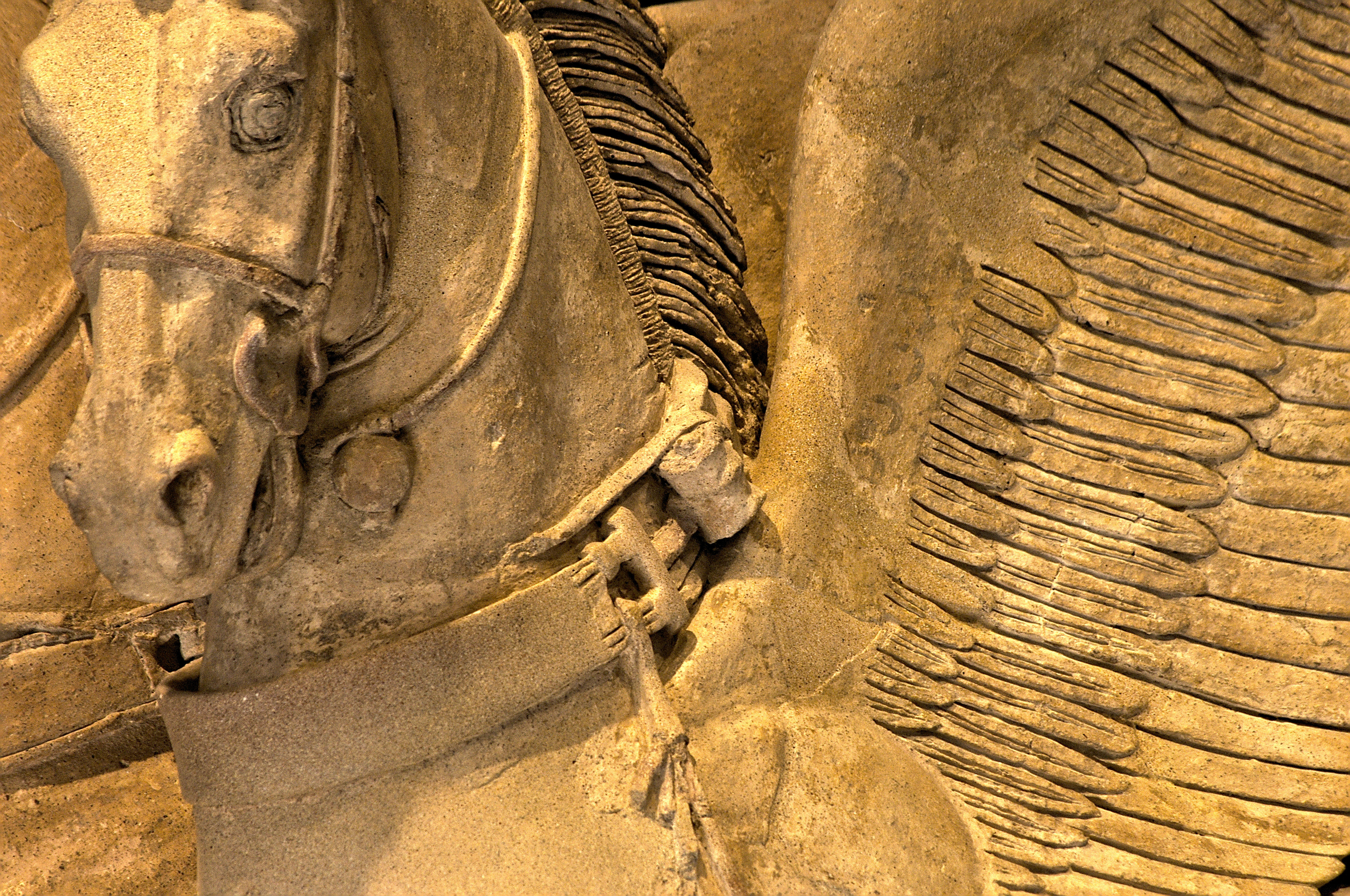
Detail of the Winged Horses (Tarquinia)

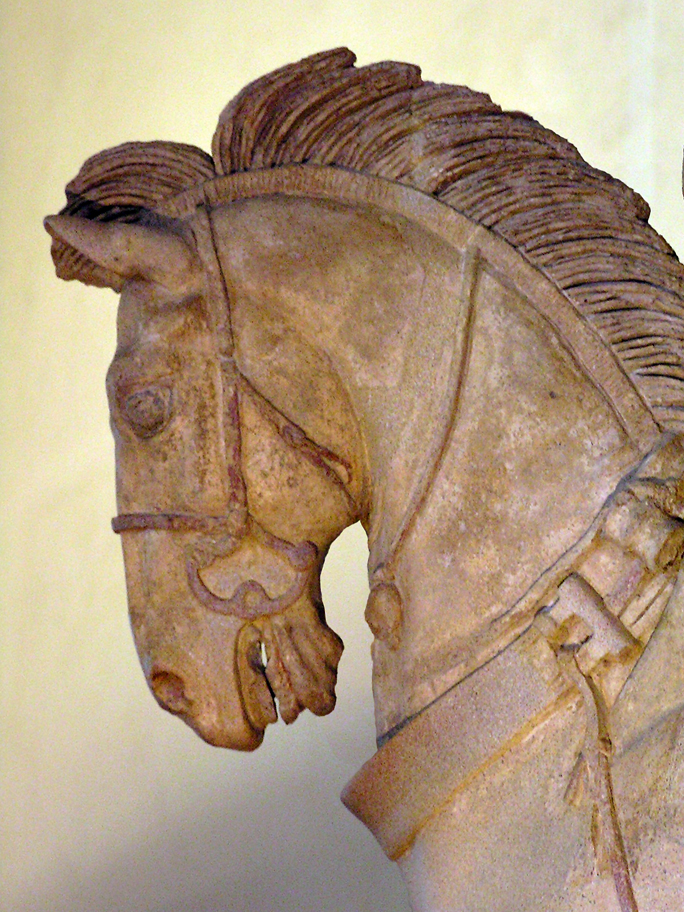

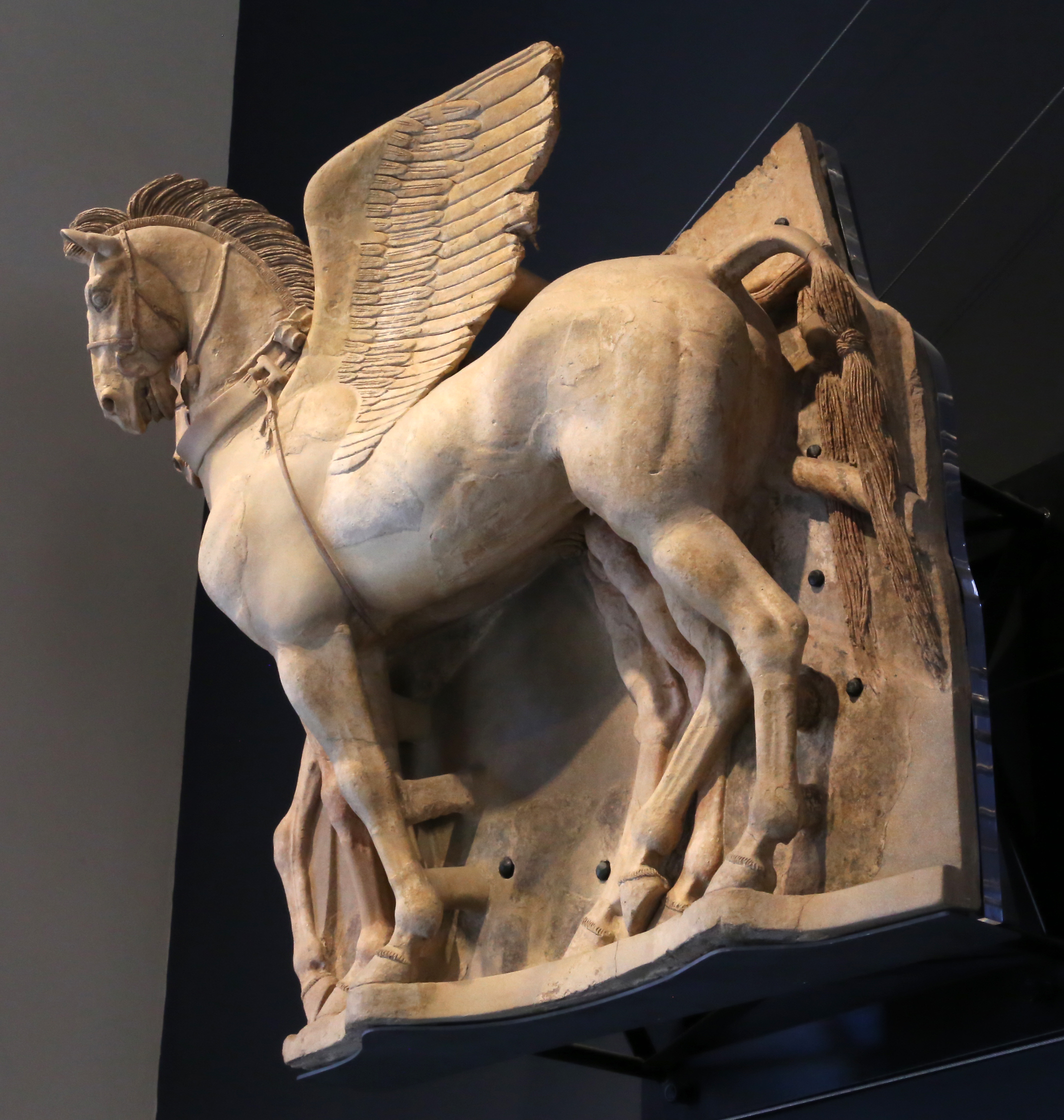
