= Bocchoris vase =

Ancient Egyptian container

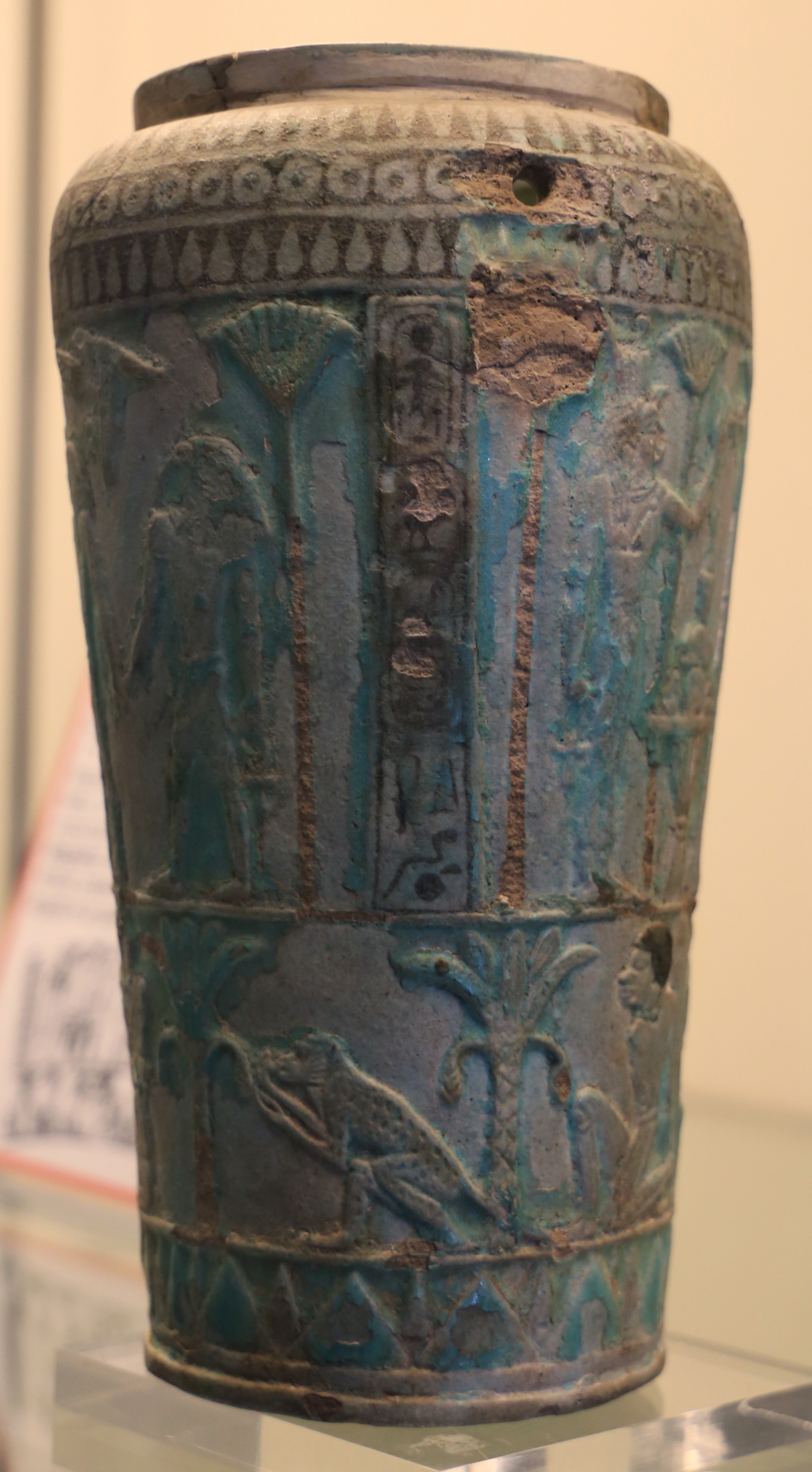
- Material: Egyptian faience
- Size: 22.2 cm high
- Writing: Ancient Egyptian hieroglyphs
- Created: 8th century BCE
- Discovered: Bocchoris' Tomb, Monterozzi necropolis, Tarquinia (Italy)
- Present location: Tarquinia National Museum

The Bocchoris vase is a faience container dating from ancient Egypt. It was found in 1895 in a tomb at Tarquinia, and is now in the National Museum at Tarquinia (22.2 cm high; Museum inv. no. RC 2010). The vessel, often also labelled as situla and made of Egyptian faience, bears an inscription with the names of the 24th Dynasty pharaoh Wahkare Bakenrenef (Ancient Greek: Bocchoris) who ruled about 720 to 715 BC. It shows the king between the Egyptian goddess Neith and the god Horus in the middle register, on one side and on the other between Horus and Thoth. In the lower register are shown Kushite prisoners between monkeys eating dates from palm trees, a depiction which was considered by Egyptologist Toby Wilkinson as racial propaganda. The vessel is an important evidence for long distance trade in the 9th and 8th century BC. It is furthermore of some importance for dating earlier phases of Etruscan culture in Italy. Because of the good preservation of the vessel, it has been argued that it came very shortly after it was made into the Etruscan tomb.

The place of production of the vase is under discussion. The object appears on the first view as fully Egyptian. The hieroglyphs are readable. However, some researchers regard the vase as a product of a Phoenician workshop, since it is known that the Phoenicians often produced objects in Egyptian style. The Phoenician origin was suggested after the discovery of a similar – yet of a somewhat lower quality – vessel near Motya, Sicily. However, the finding at Tarquinia of two situliform vessels with the names of Psamtik I and Psamtik II respectively, again suggested a Lower Egyptian origin of the Bocchoris vase.

The vase was found in 1895 in a tomb chamber with a pitched roof and a bench. The tomb owner might be a woman judging from the objects found: gold foil plaques might have adorned clothing; many Egyptian beads were found (two beads show the Egyptian god Bes); there were bronze and pottery vessels. Due to the Bocchoris vase being the best known object from the tomb, by metonymy the whole tomb is often called "Bocchoris Tomb", despite not having any connection with the actual burial place of king Bakenrenef/Bocchoris, which is still unknown.
