= Tarquinia National Museum =

- Museo Archeologico Nazionale Tarquiniense
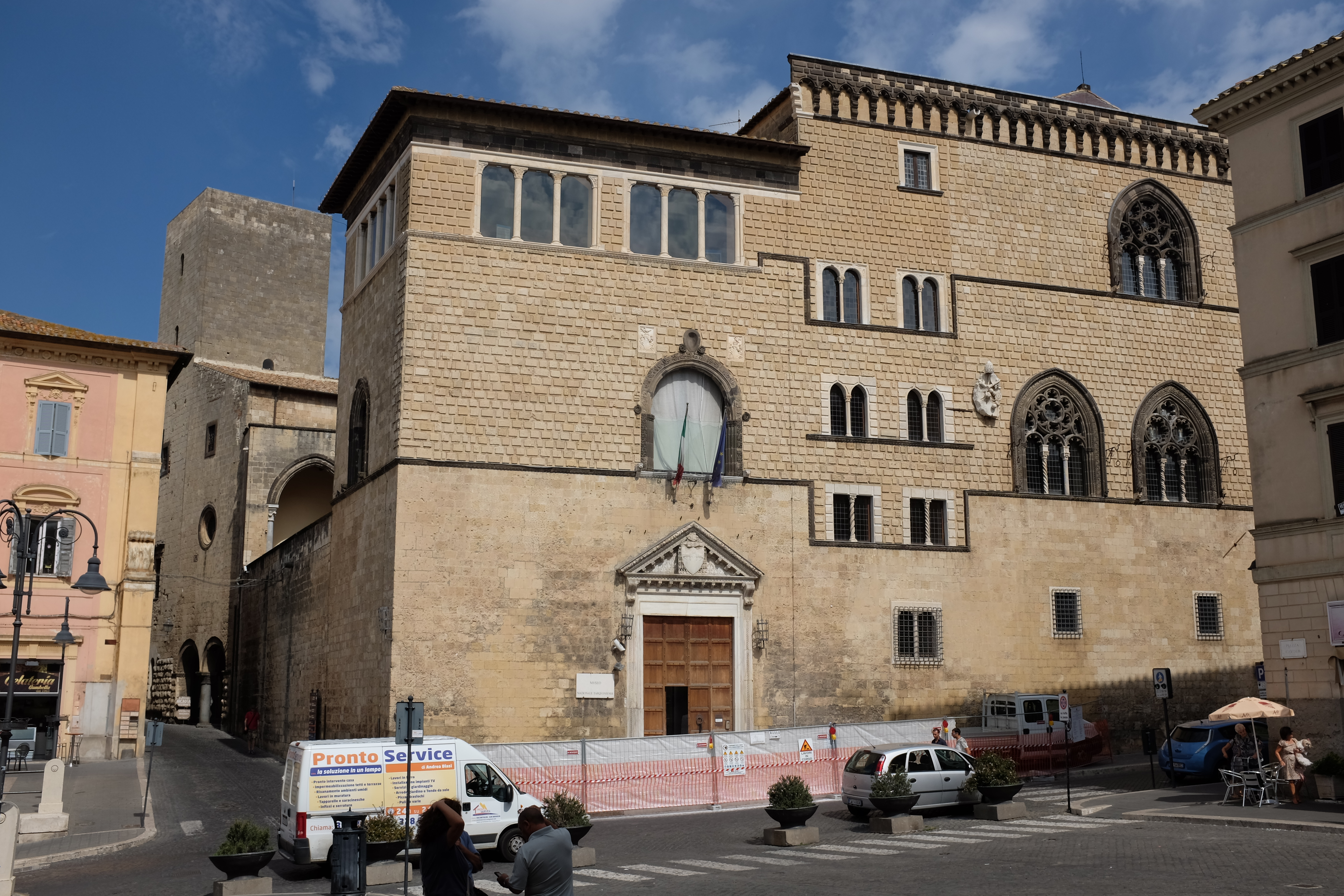
- The museum is housed in the Palazzo Vitelleschi.

- Location within Italy
- Established: 1924
- Location: Piazza Cavour 1a, Tarquinia, Province of Viterbo, Lazio, Italy
- Coordinates: 42°15′13″N 11°45′20″E
- Type: Archaeological museum
- Director: Maria Gabriella Scapaticci
- Website: Official website

The Tarquinia National Museum (Italian: Museo Archeologico Nazionale Tarquiniense) is an archaeological museum dedicated to the Etruscan civilization in Tarquinia, Italy. Its collection consists primarily of the artifacts which were excavated from the Necropolis of Monterozzi to the east of the city. It is housed in the Palazzo Vitelleschi.

== History ==
The Palazzo Vitelleschi was built between 1436 and 1439 for the cardinal of Corneto, the former name of Tarquinia. After the cardinal's death the palace was used as stopover for the popes. Over time the Soderini family became its new owner and it was turned into a hotel. In 1900 it was acquired by the city of Tarquinia, which donated it to the Italian state in 1916. The state intended to use the palace for the current museum, which opened in 1924. It was the result of the merger of the Municipal Collection and the private collection of the counts Bruschi-Falgari. Over the time the collection was enriched by the numerous finds from the ancient city of Tarquinia and the Necropolis of Monterozzi.

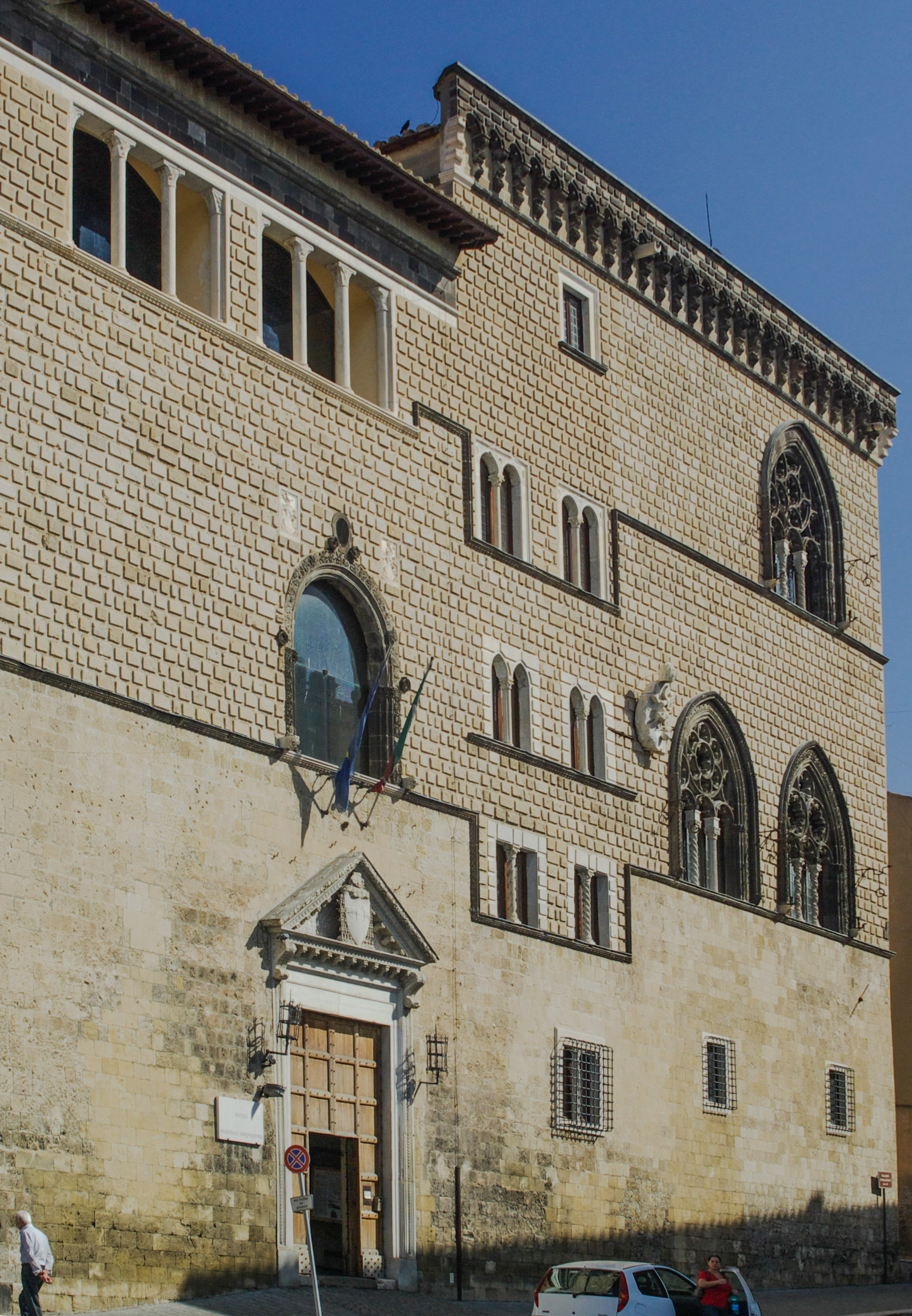

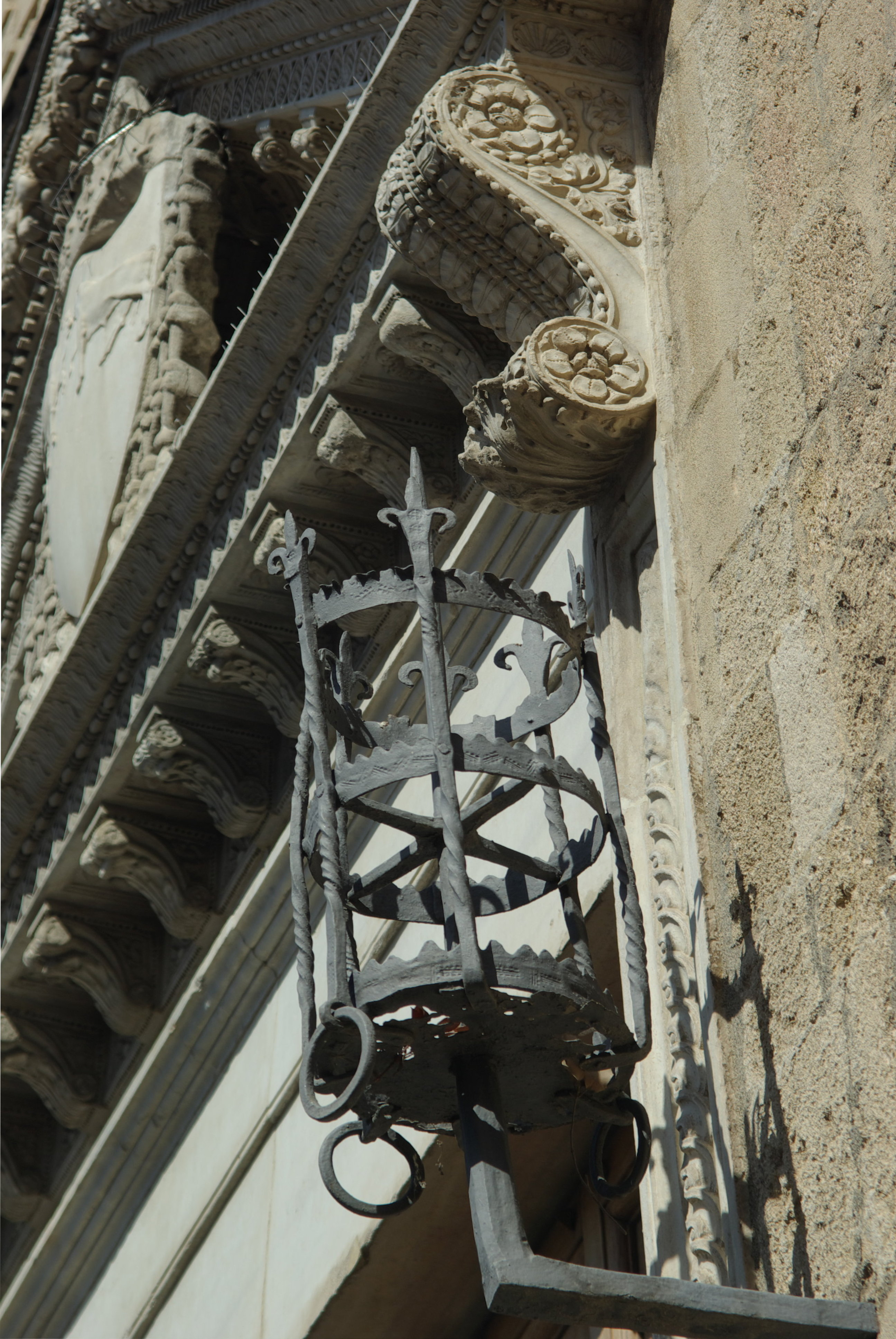

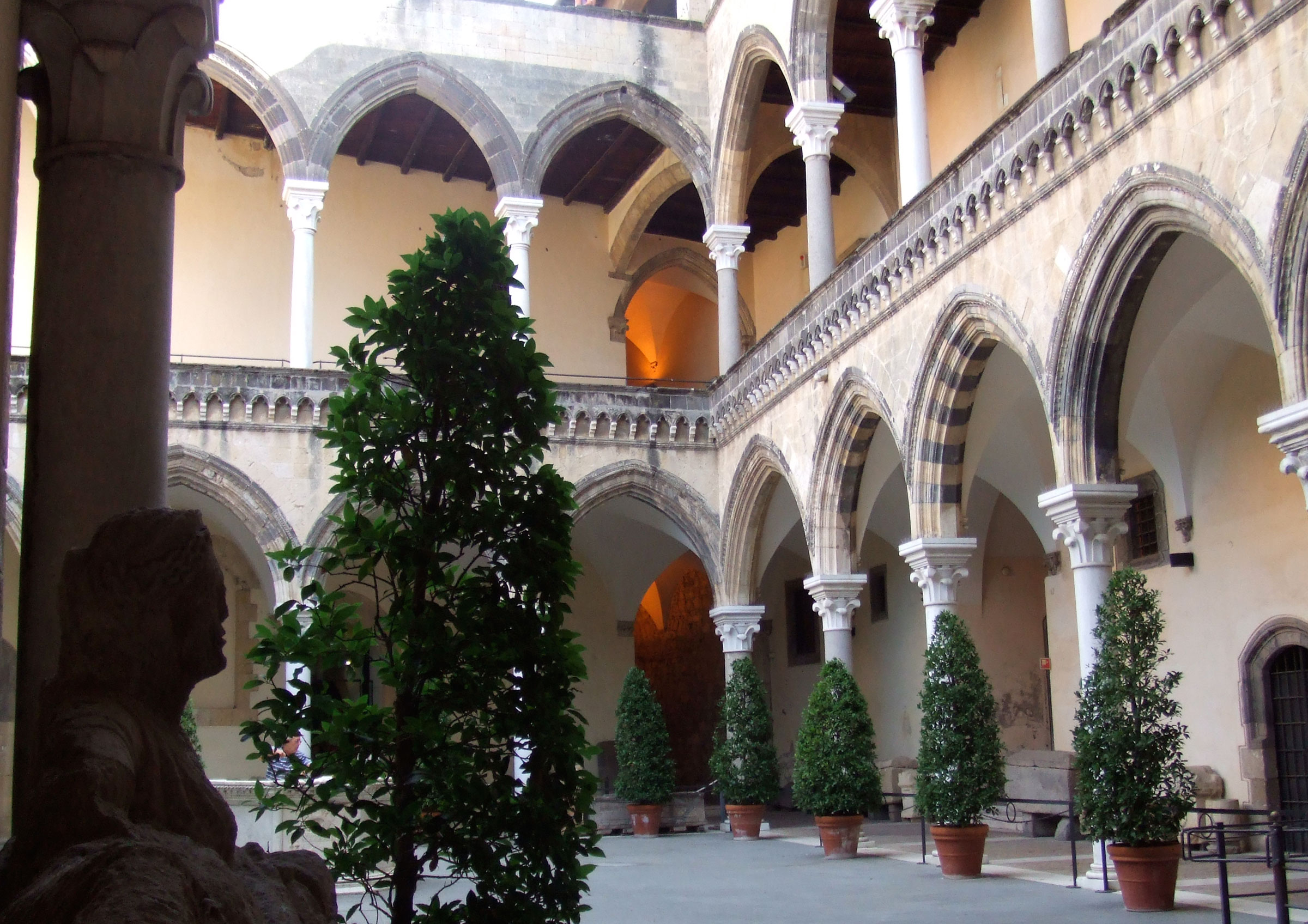
The courtyard of Palazzo Vitelleschi

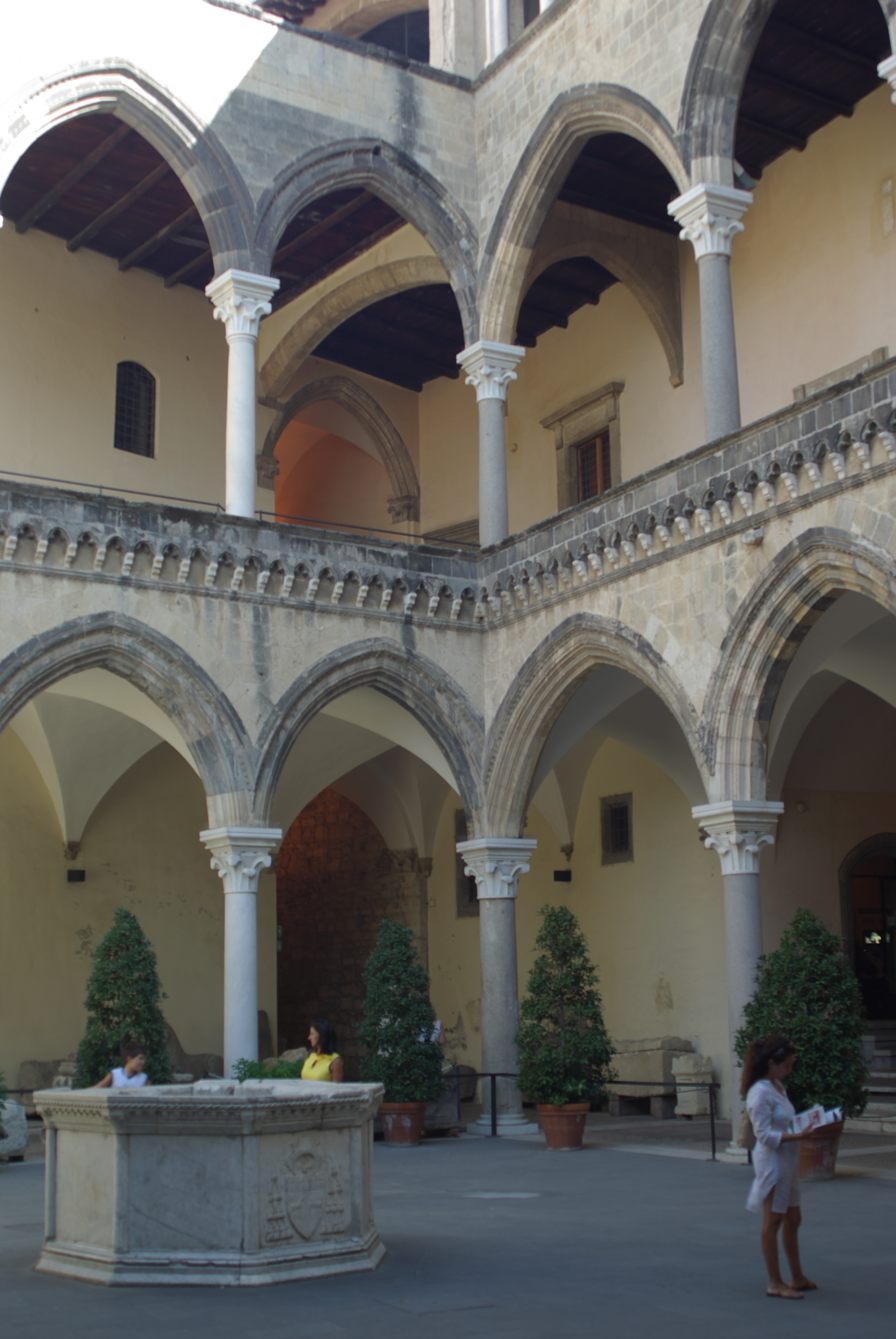

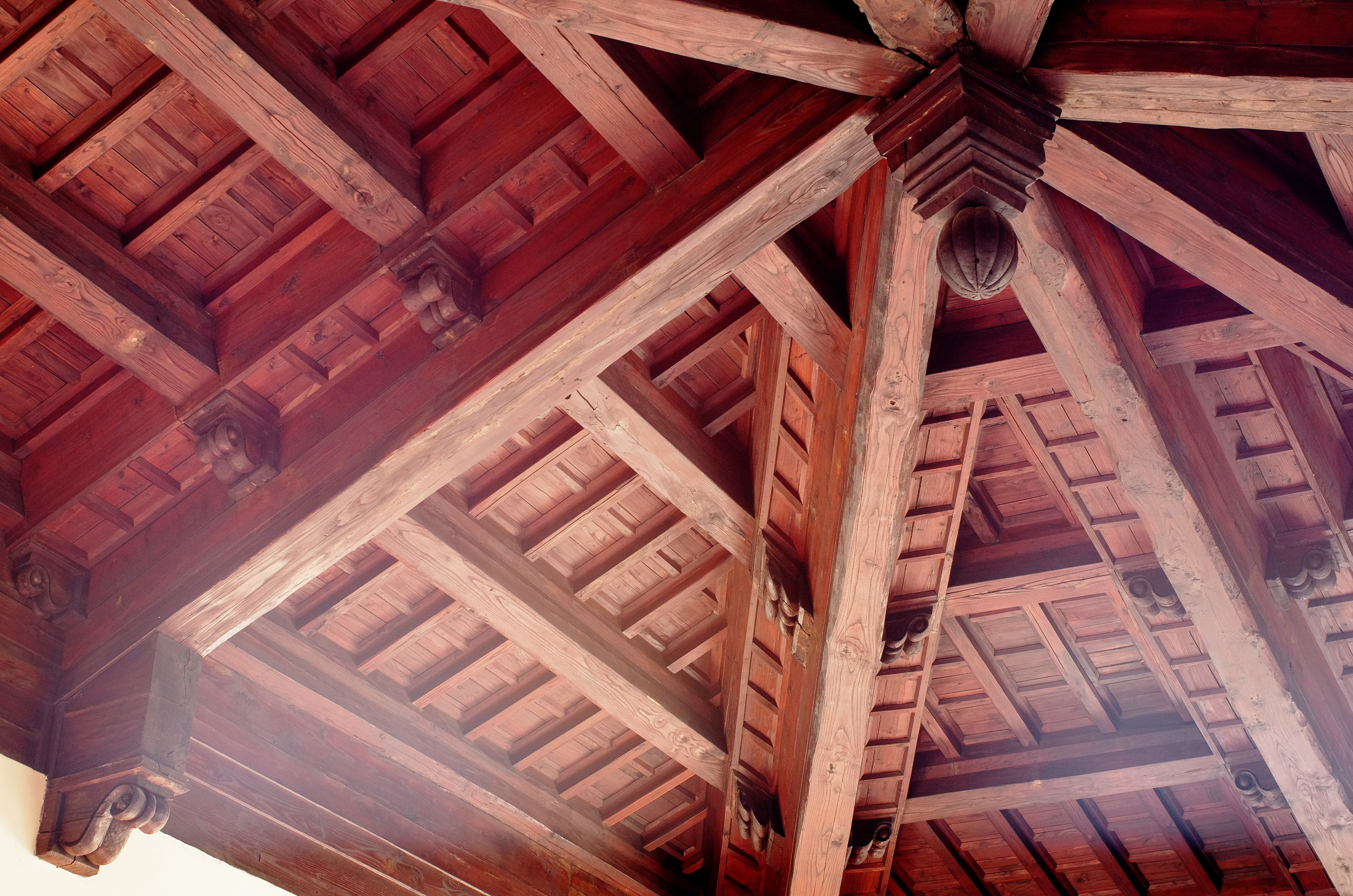

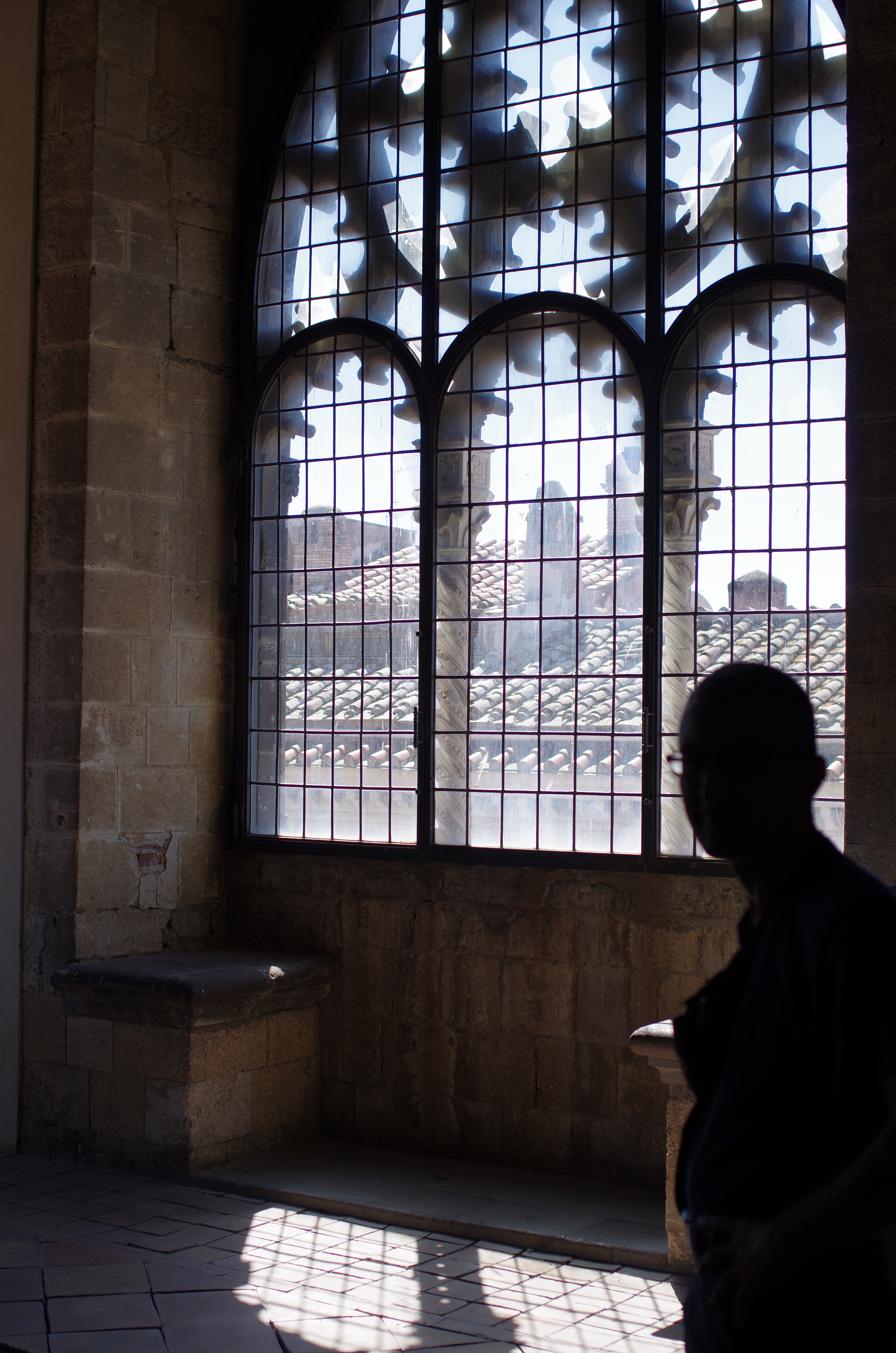

== Collection ==
The Palazzo Vitelleschi has three floors. On the ground floor the sarcophagi, including the important Sarcophagus of Laris Pulenas, and other stone artifacts from the middle of the fourth century BC are exhibited in chronological order. The most notable sarcophagi which belonged to the most important Tarquinian families are seen in the tenth room. Some of these were carved from Greek marble.

The first floor shows the pottery in chronological order, starting with the Villanovan culture. Both the native Etruscan type of pottery called bucchero and imported pottery is on display here. Pottery dated to the Orientalizing period and onward was imported from Ancient Egypt, Phoenicia and Ancient Greece. Among these ceramics was the Bocchoris vase, which dates from the Ancient Egyptian 24th dynasty. Especially pottery from Corinth was imported in large quantities from the end of the seventh to the sixth century BC and imitated by the Etruscans. Some bronze tableware also dates to the Orientalizing period. After this comes the Attic black-figure and red-figure pottery from the fourth century BC, the Classical period. A collection of Etruscan bronze coins is exhibited in the ballroom. In the same room are later gold coins from the Roman Empire which were found at Gravisca, Tarquinia's ancient harbor, and gold jewelry. The first floor ends with a collection of votive offerings.

The winged horses relief which decorated the pediment of the Ara della Regina temple.

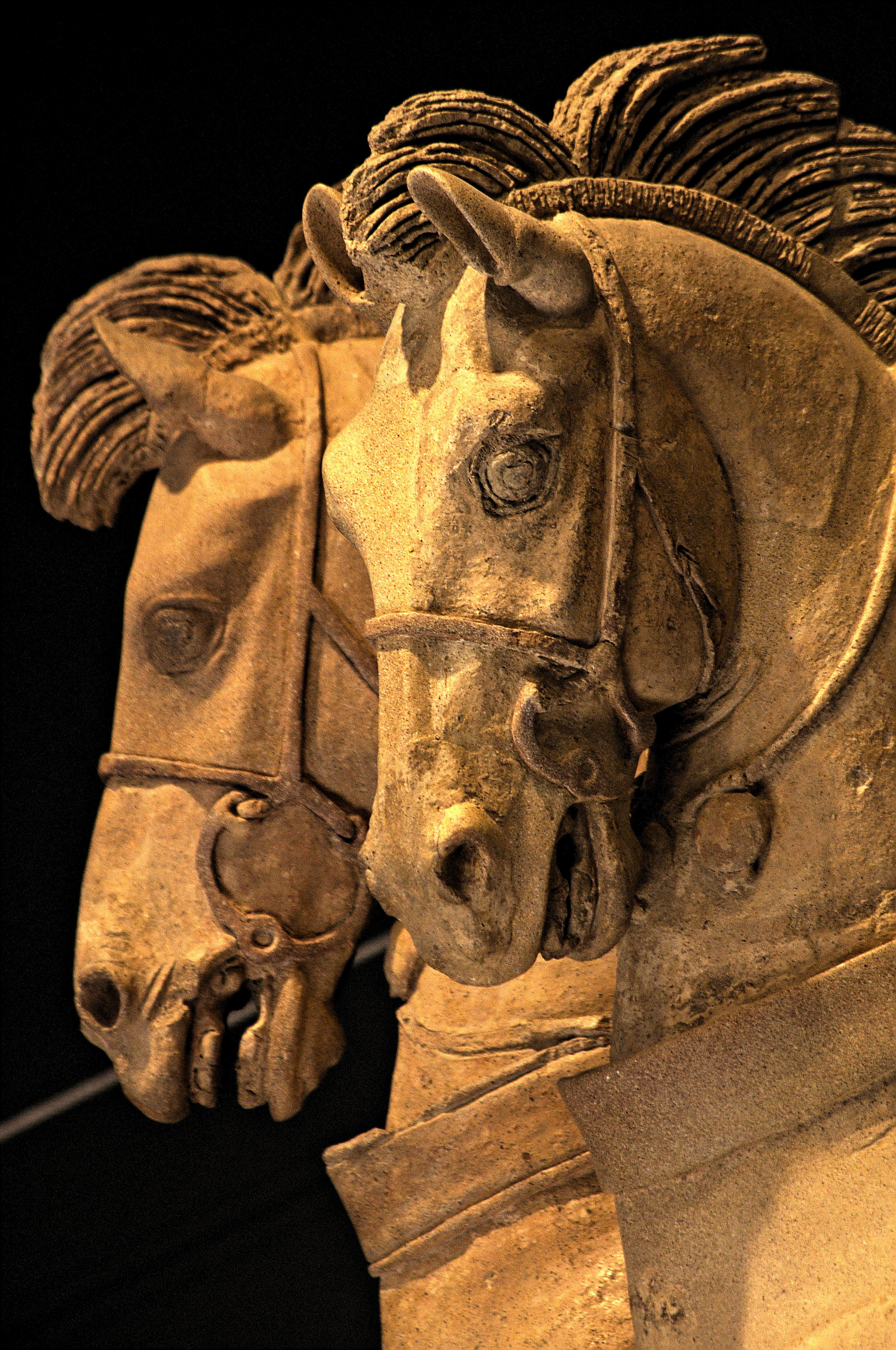
Details of The winged horses

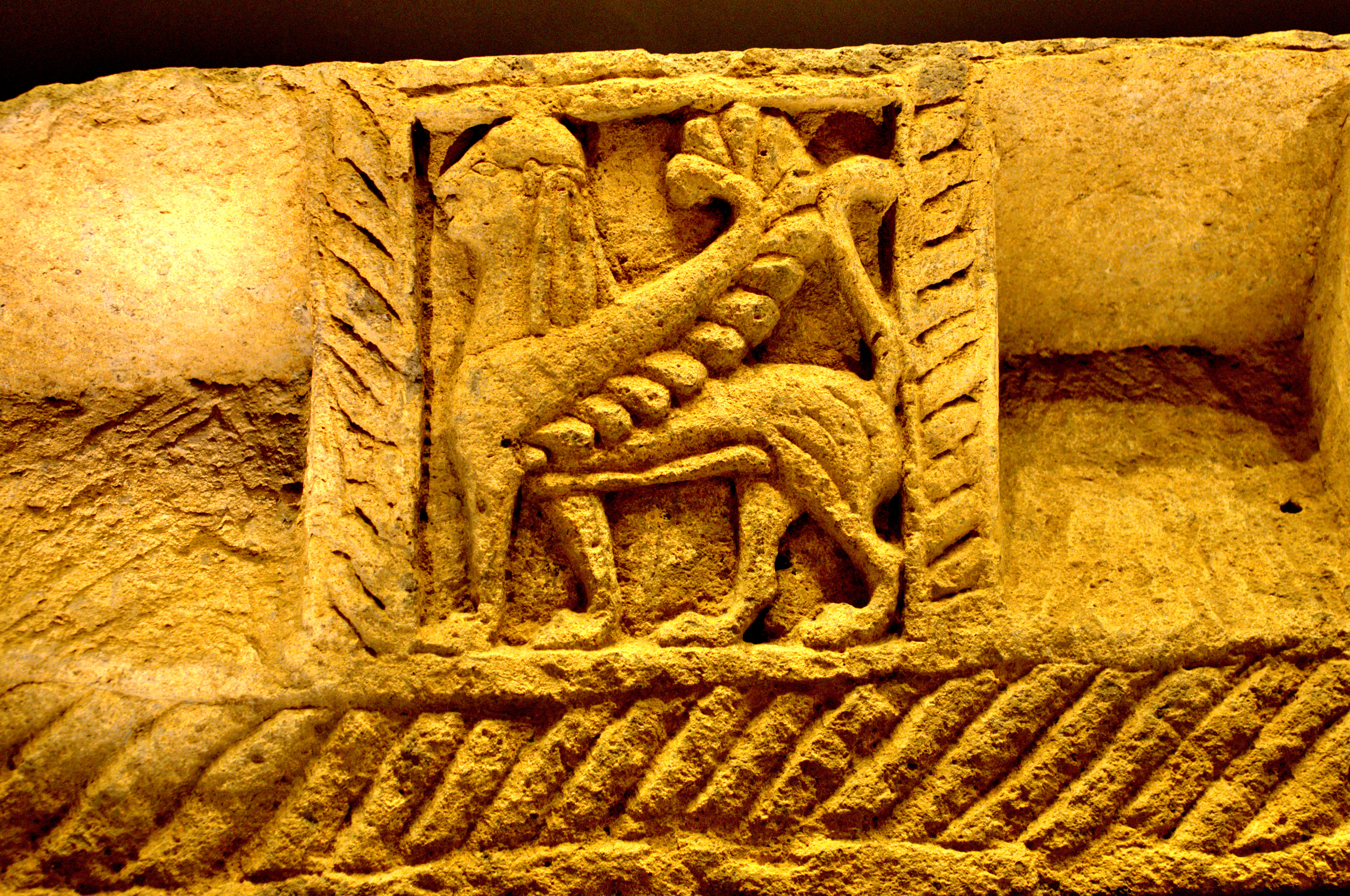
Etruscan relief with sphinxe

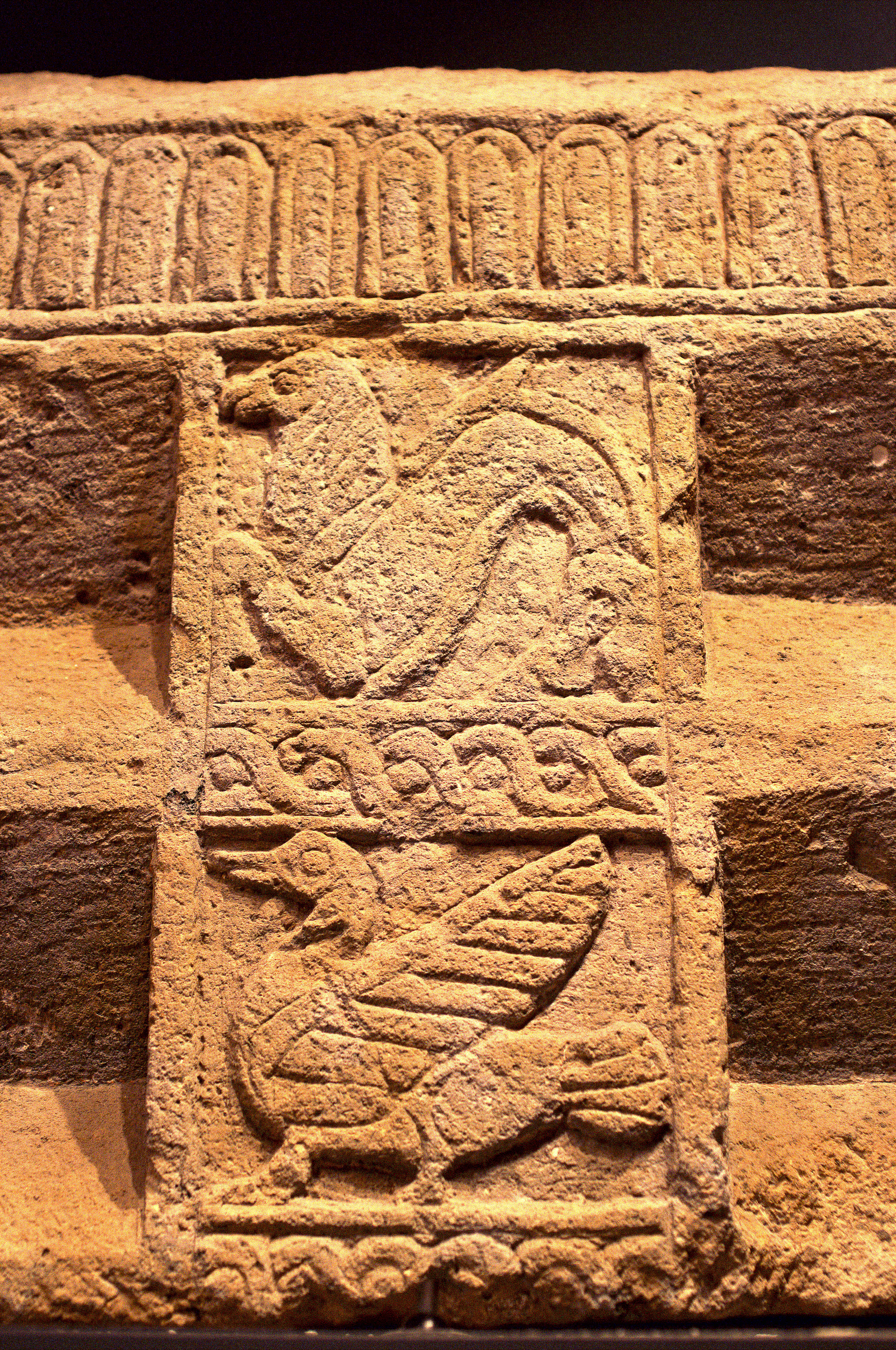
Etruscan relief

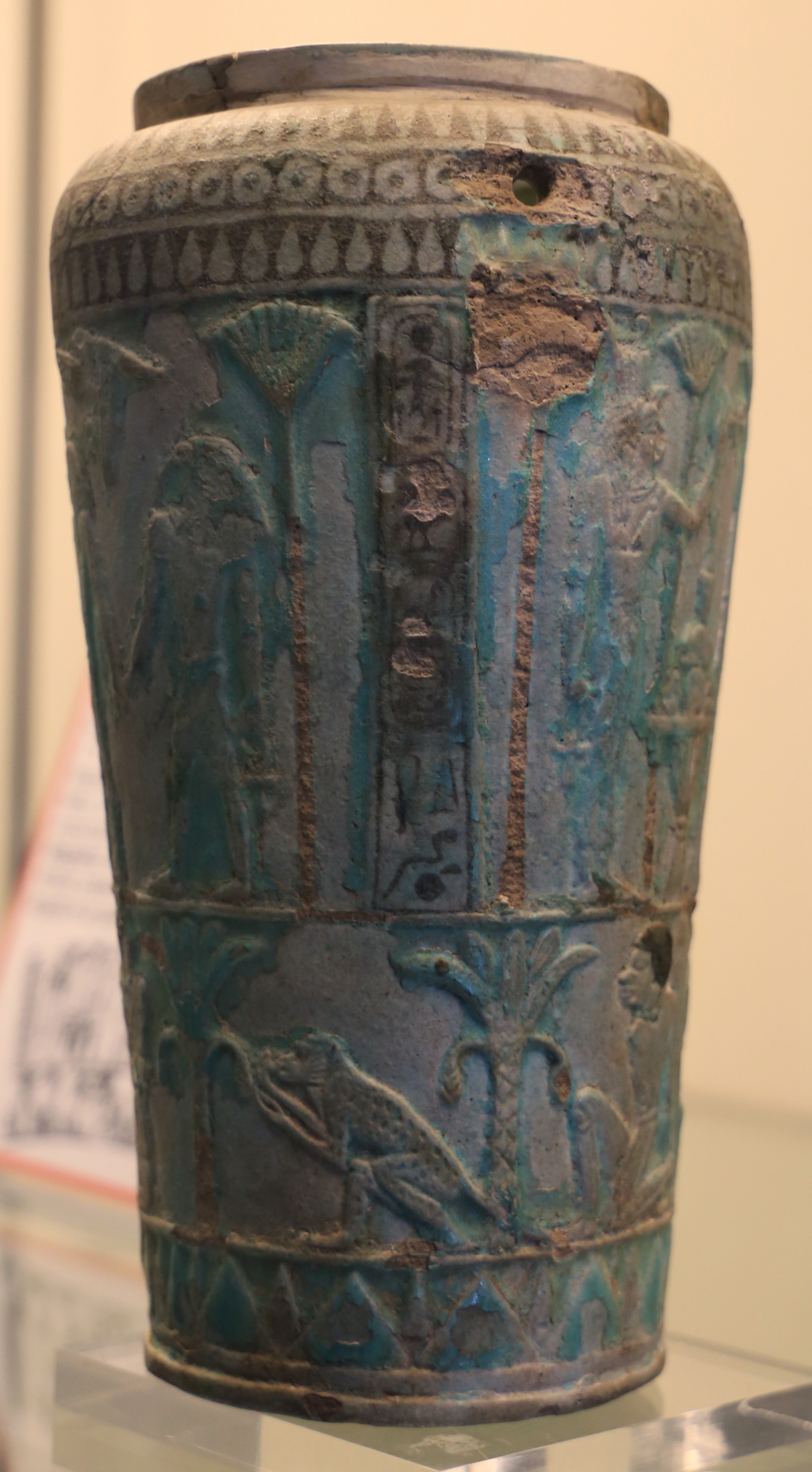
The Bocchoris vase

The second floor is a square porch which offers a view over the city and the countryside. This floor houses some of the restored paintings from the tombs of the Necropolis of Monterozzi. The tombs are the Tomb of the Triclinium, the Tomb of the Bigas, the Tomb of the Olympic Games and the Tomb of the Ship. In the hall of weapons the "Cavalli Alati" are exhibited, a relief of a pair of winged horses. They once decorated the Ara della Regina, an Etruscan temple in Tarquinia which dates to the fourth century BC.

== See also ==
- National Etruscan Museum
