= Spurinnia gens =

Ancient Roman family

The gens Spurinnia was a minor plebeian family of Etruscan descent at ancient Rome. Few members of this gens are mentioned by ancient writers, of whom the most prominent was the haruspex Spurinna, who warned Caesar of danger in the month leading to his assassination, but was disbelieved. Other Spurinnae are known from inscriptions, at least two referring to persons who held the praetorship, or chief magistracy, of Tarquinii at some remote period, and commemorating their military achievements.

== Origin ==
The nomen Spurinna belongs to a class of gentilicia of Etruscan origin, readily distinguished by the suffix -inna, characteristic of Etruscan nomina. The inscriptions of this gens, mostly belonging to the imperial era, and all of which come from either Rome or Etruria, demonstrate that the feminine form was Spurinnia. As a cognomen, Spurinna appears in the Vestricia gens, the members of which gained considerable fame from the time of Caesar to that of Trajan, but the majority of epigraphic occurrences are as a nomen gentilicium.

== Praenomina ==
The early inscriptions of the Spurinnae include the Etruscan praenomina Lars and Velthur, along with Aulus, a name common to both the Latins and Etruscans. Later epigraphy provides examples of Lucius, Publius, and Quintus, three of the most common names throughout Roman history.

== Members ==
This list includes abbreviated praenomina. For an explanation of this practice, see filiation.

- Lars Spurinna, father of Velthur Spurinna, the praetor of Tarquinii, and perhaps the grandfather of Aulus Spurinna, also praetor of Tarquinii.
- Velthur Spurinna La. f., twice praetor of Tarquinii, according to a marble inscription, twice led armies overseas, including one that was victorious in Sicily. He might be the father of Aulus Spurinna, also praetor of Tarquinii, whose father was named Velthur.
- Aulus Spurinna Vth. f., thrice praetor of Tarquinii, according to an inscription stating that he drove out the king of Caere, defeated Arretium, and occupied nine fortresses of the Latins.
- Spurinna, a young man of great beauty, who was much desired by noblewomen, and supposedly marred his own face in order to abate their desire, and allay the jealousy of their husbands and the wrath of their fathers. He must have lived no later than the fourth century BC, as Valerius Maximus states that this occurred before Roman citizenship was extended to the Etruscans.
- Publius Spurinna, named in a sepulchral inscription from Tarquinii in Etruria, dating from the third quarter of the second century BC.
- Spurinna, (Note: Some reference sources call him Vestricius or Vestritius Spurinna, perhaps on the assumption that Spurinna was merely a hereditary cognomen of the Vestricia gens, rather than a nomen gentilicium. However, Valerius Maximus and Suetonius, the only Roman writers who name him, call him simply Spurinna.) a haruspex, warned Caesar that he would be in mortal peril for the month leading up to the Ides of March, 44 BC. When they chanced to meet on the morning of the fateful day, Caesar noted that the Ides had come, to which Spurinna replied that the day was not yet past.
- Spurinnia Longa, buried at Tarquinii in Etruria, aged seventy-five, in a tomb dating from the third quarter of the first century BC.
- Spurinnia L. f. Thannia, buried at Tarquinii, aged ninety-four, in a tomb dating from the third quarter of the first century BC.
- Spurinnia P. l. Eleutheris, a freedwoman buried at Rome during the first century.
- Spurinnia Nice Torquatiana, the nurse of Titus Julius Antigonus, buried at Rome during the middle part of the first century, in a tomb dedicated by Antigonus and his brother-in-law, Primigenius, the slave of Lucius Volusius Saturninus, for Spurinnia and Charis, the wife of Primigenius.
- Quintus Spurinna Q. f. Quintianus, an eques from Laurentum in Latium, was one of the municipal duumvirs at Arretium in Etruria during the reign of Severus Alexander, and held several other positions of trust during his public career.

=== Undated Spurinnae ===
- Spurinna Firmus, buried at Tarquinii, aged thirty.
- Lucius Spurinna Florus, one of the quattuorviri at Volsinii in Etruria.
- Lucius Spurinna Ɔ. l. Hilarus, a freedman buried at Rome.

== See also ==
- List of Roman gentes

== Bibliography ==
- Valerius Maximus, Factorum ac Dictorum Memorabilium (Memorable Facts and Sayings).
- Lucius Mestrius Plutarchus (Plutarch), Lives of the Noble Greeks and Romans (Parallel Lives).
- Gaius Suetonius Tranquillus, De Vita Caesarum (Lives of the Caesars, or The Twelve Caesars).
- Lucius Cassius Dio, Roman History.
- Dictionary of Greek and Roman Biography and Mythology, William Smith, ed., Little, Brown and Company, Boston (1849).
- Theodor Mommsen et alii, Corpus Inscriptionum Latinarum (The Body of Latin Inscriptions, abbreviated CIL), Berlin-Brandenburgische Akademie der Wissenschaften (1853–present).
- René Cagnat et alii, L'Année épigraphique (The Year in Epigraphy, abbreviated AE), Presses Universitaires de France (1888–present).
- August Pauly, Georg Wissowa, et alii, Realencyclopädie der Classischen Altertumswissenschaft (Scientific Encyclopedia of the Knowledge of Classical Antiquities, abbreviated RE or PW), J. B. Metzler, Stuttgart (1894–1980).
- George Davis Chase, "The Origin of Roman Praenomina", in Harvard Studies in Classical Philology, vol. VIII, pp. 103–184 (1897).
- Mario Torelli, Elogia Tarquiniensia, Sansoni, Florence (1975).
