= Sarcophagus of Laris Pulenas =

2nd century BC Etruscan coffin

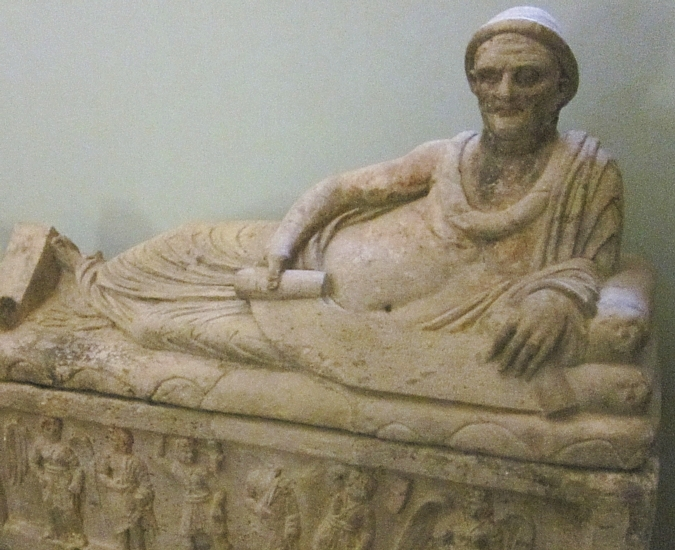
- The Sarcophagus of Laris Pulenas, in the Tarquinia National Museum
- Material: Limestone
- Writing: Etruscan alphabet
- Created: 2nd or 3rd century BCE
- Discovered: Tarquinia
- Present location: Tarquinia National Museum, Tarquinia, Italy
- Identification: CIE n.5430
- Language: Etruscan language
- Culture: Etruscan

The Sarcophagus of Laris Pulenas, also known as "The Magistrate," dates from the 2nd or 3rd century BCE. It was discovered in Tarquinia in Italy and is now in the Tarquinia National Museum. It features a reclining figure, Laris Pulenas, before whom is a stone carving of a long strip of cloth (volumen), half-unrolled, inscribed with one of the longer continuous inscriptions in Etruscan (Corpus Inscriptionum Etruscarum, n.5430), nearly 60 words, making it of particular linguistic value.

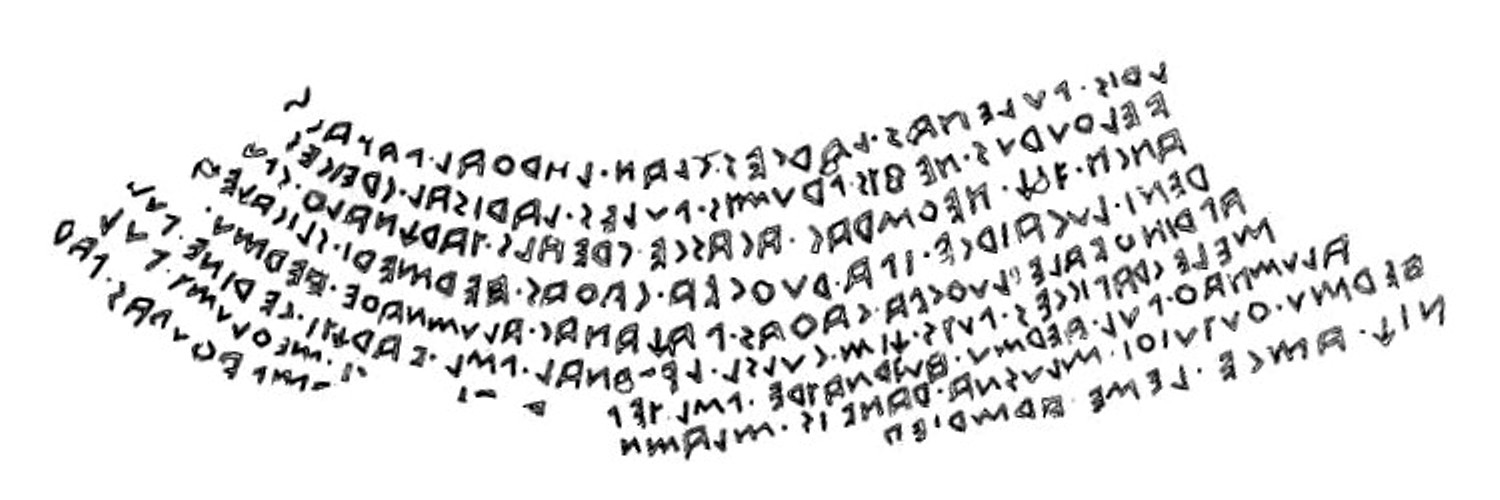
Inscription engraved on a sarcophagus from Tarquinia

The text opens with the name of the deceased, along with that of his father (Larce), and unusually, also those of his grandfather (Larth), his uncle (Velthuru), and his great-grandfather (Pule Laris Creice "the Greek"—possibly Pollus, a Greek seer who lived around 400 BC. and settled in Cerveteri—the Etruscan Cisra). The rest of the text apparently presents the deceased's accomplishments in life, including that he wrote a text on divination (zich nethshrac acas-ce). He also served as a priest of Catha and of Pacha (Etruscan Bacchus, at this point in history in the process of merging with Fufluns, the Etruscan Dionysus). Furthermore, he seems to have governed (laucar-ce) the city of Tarquinia (Tarχnalθ spurem) as a creal, apparently some high public office.

Text from Albert Grünwedel

1 Lris · Pulenas · Larces · clan · Larthal · papacs
2 Velthurus · nefts · prumpts · Pules · Larisal · Creices
3 anen · zich · nethshrac · acasce · creals · Tarχnalθ · spu
4 rem · lucaircẹ · ipa · ruθcva · Caθas · hermeri · slicaχ̣
eṃ
5 aprinθvale · luθcva · Caθas · Paχanac · alumnaθe · hermu
6 mele · Crapisces · puts · χim · Culsl · Lẹp̣rnal · pσl · varχti · cẹrine · pul
7 alumnaθ · pul · hermu · huzrnatre · pσl · tenịṇ[e -5-] ci

== See also ==
- Etruscan language
- Etruscan religion
