= Mario Torelli =

Italian archaeologist and art historian (1937–2020)

- Born: May 12, 1937; Rome, Italy
- Died: September 15, 2020 (aged 83); Scicli, Italy
- Occupations: Archaeologist and university teacher
- Known for: Etruscology; Classical archaeology; Roman archaeology
- Awards: Balzan Prize (2014)

Academic background
- Education: Università di Roma 'La Sapienza'
- Doctoral advisor: Ranuccio Bianchi Bandinelli

Academic work
- Discipline: Archaeology
- Institutions: University of Perugia

Mario Torelli (May 12, 1937 – September 15, 2020) was an Italian scholar of Italic archaeology and the culture of the Etruscans. He taught at the University of Perugia.

Torelli was born in Rome, Italy. He was trained by the art historian Ranuccio Bianchi Bandinelli as well as by Massimo Pallottino. Torelli completed his laurea degree at the University of Rome "La Sapienza" in November 1960, writing a thesis on the site of Falerii Veteres.

He held many posts during his professional life, beginning as an assistant at the center for ancient art history in Rome (1960–1962), followed by a stint as archaeological inspector of the Villa Giulia Museum in Rome (1964–1969). He was appointed a professor of Greek and Roman art history at the University of Cagliari in 1969, and served in that position until 1973. He was also instrumental in the excavations of the sanctuary at the site of Gravisca. Torelli joined the faculty of the University of Perugia in 1975; he was appointed as full professor (professore ordinario) of Archaeology and the History of Greek and Roman Art on 1 November 1976. His position was supplemented with appointments that included the areas of Magna Graecia (1995-2000) and Etruscan and Italic Archaeology (from 2000).

During his long archaeological career, Torelli directed and supervised a number of archaeological excavations. These included work on the Etruscan sanctuary of Menerva at Santa Marinella (1964-1966), the Etruscan sanctuary of the Porta Caere at Veii (1966-1969), the Greek mercantile sanctuary of Gravisca (1969-1979), the extra-urban sanctuary of Aphrodite-Venus at Paestum (1982-1985), and excavations at Heraclea that included the sanctuary of Demeter (1985-1986) and the agora (1987-1991).

He was a visiting professor at a number of institutions, including; University of Colorado at Boulder (1974); University of Michigan at Ann Arbor (1978); University of California, Irvine (1979); École Normale Supérieure de Rue d’Ulm in Paris (1984); Université de Paris I – Sorbonne (1985); Collège de France (1986); University of Alberta, Canada (1986); Nellie Wallace lecturer at Oxford (1988), and University of Bristol (1993). In the fall semester of 1982 Torelli was a member of the Institute for Advanced Study in Princeton, New Jersey, and was a Getty Scholar at the Getty Center for the History of Art and the Humanities in Los Angeles in 1990–1991. In 1992 he delivered the Thomas Spencer Jerome lecture at the University of Michigan with the topic "Roman Historical Reliefs: The Structure and Shaping of Ancient Attitudes", which resulted in the publication of a typological study of Roman historical relief sculpture.

He was a member of the Deutsches Archaeologisches Institut, and a member of the Istituto Nazionale di Studi Etruschi in Florence. In 2013 Torelli received an honorary doctoral degree honoris causa from the Universidad de Jaén. On September 8, 2014, Torelli was awarded the Balzan Prize for Classical archaeology. Giorgio Napolitano, then president of the Republic of Italy, presented Torelli with the award in Rome on November 20, 2014. The citation praises the "innovative character" of Torelli's work and his deep commitment to archaeology. Torelli died in Donnalucata di Scicli (Ragusa), Sicily.

== Selected works ==
- Elogia tarquiniensia (Florence, 1975)
- (with Martha Welborn Baldwin) Latin Inscriptions in the Kelsey Museum: The Dennison Collection (Kelsey Museum Studies; 4) (Ann Arbor, 1979)
- Necropoli dell'Italia antica (Milan, 1982)
- Typology & structure of Roman historical reliefs (Ann Arbor, 1982)
- Storia degli etruschi (Rome-Bari, 1981)
- Lavinio e Roma : riti iniziatici e matrimonio tra archeologia e storia (Rome, 1984)
- La società etrusca : l'età arcaica, l'età classica (Rome, 1987)
- (with Pierre Gros) Storia dell'urbanistica : il mondo romano (Rome-Bari, 1988); 2nd edition 2009.
- La daunia nell'età della romanizzazione, Edipuglia (1990)
- "PRAEDIA CLARISSIMORUM ETRURIAE." Archeologia Classica (Vol. 43, TOMO PRIMO: MISCELLANEA ETRUSCA E ITALICA IN ONORE DI MASSIMO PALLOTTINO) (1991) pp. 459–474.
- Atlante dei siti archeologici della Toscana (Rome, 1992)
- Etruria (Guide archeologiche Laterza, 3) (Rome-Bari, 1993)
- Studies in the Romanization of Italy (Edmonton, 1995)
- Il rango, il rito e l'immagine : alle origini della rappresentazione storica romana (Milan, 1997)
- Tota Italia : essays in the cultural formation of Roman Italy (Oxford, 1999)
- (with Francesca Boitani) "Un nuovo santuario dell'Emporion di Gravisca." 'Actes de la rencontre scientifique en hommage à Georges Vallet organisée par le Centre Jean-Bérard, l'École française de Rome, l'Istituto universitario orientale et l'Università degli studi di Napoli "Federico II" (Rome-Naples, 15-18 novembre 1995) Publications de l'École Française de Rome 251 (1999) pp. 93-102
- The Etruscans (Milan, 2001)]
- Le strategie di Kleitias. Composizione e programma figurativo del vaso François (Milan, 2007)
- (with Anna Maria Sgubini Moretti) Etruschi : le antiche metropoli del Lazio (Milan, 2008)
- (with Elisa Marroni) CASTRUM INUI. Il santuario di Inuus alla foce del Fosso dell’Incastro (Monumenti Antichi, 76 – serie misc. 21). (G. Bretschneider, 2018).ISBN 978-88-7689-302-5; ISSN:0391-8084
- Collected papers: Opuscola etrusca 2010-2018 (Edizioni ETS, 2019); Opuscola romana 2010-2018 (Edizioni ETS, 2019); Opuscola Graeca 2010-2018 (Edizioni ETS, 2019)
- [Festschriften] Angiolillo, Simonetta and Marco Giuman, Marco. Il vasaio e le sue storie : giornata di studi sulla ceramica attica in onore di Mario Torelli per i suoi settanta anni, [Cagliari, Cittadella dei Musei, aula verde, 20 giugno 2007] (Cagliari : Edizioni AV, 2007); Elisa Marroni; Concetta Masseria; Mario Torelli. Dialogando : studi in onore di Mario Torelli (Pisa : ETS, 2017) Table of contents.

== Further Information ==
- Curriculum vitae
- Recent works
- Mario Torelli International Balzan Prize Foundation

== Necrology ==
- "Addio a Mario Torelli, grande archeologo amico di Pompei" La Repubblica 15 September 2020
- "Archeologia: addio a Mario Torelli, uno dei più grandi studiosi degli Etruschi Era socio dell'Accademia dei Lincei, aveva vinto il Premio Balzan nel 2014." RaiNews 15 September 2020

== Other projects ==
- Wikimedia Commons contains images or other files about Mario Torelli
- Wikiquote contains citation by or about Mario Torelli
