= San Martino, Tarquinia =

Catholic church in Viterbo province, Italy

Coordinates: 42°15′20″N 11°45′25″E

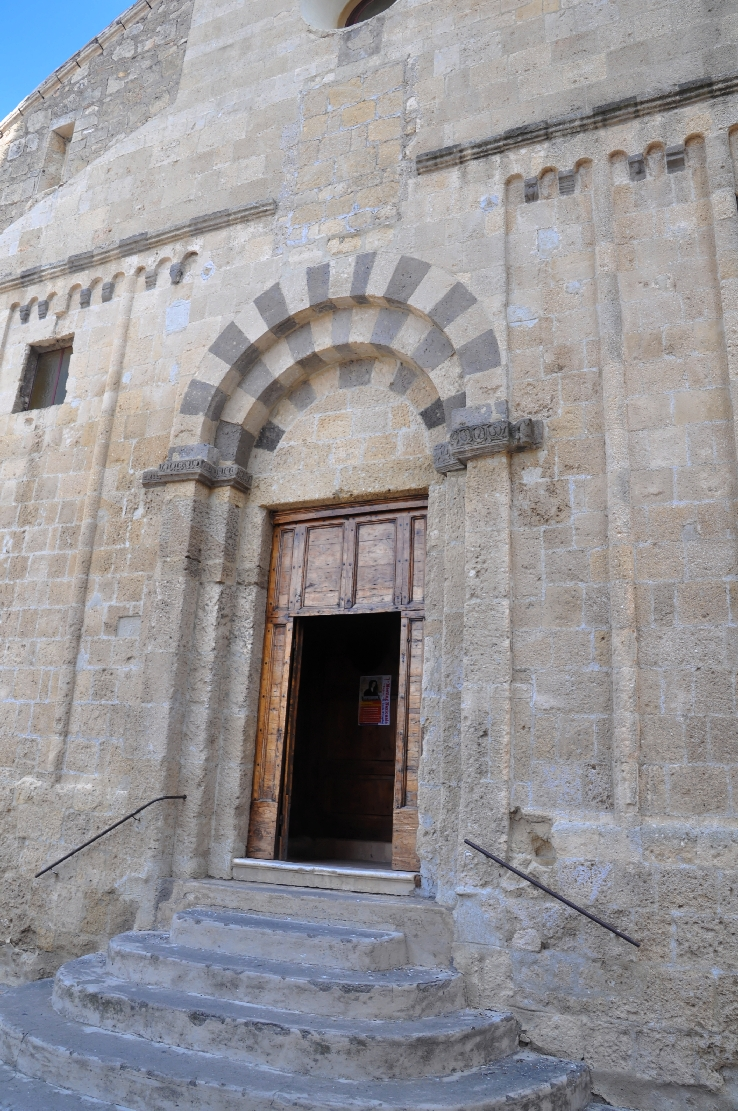
Portal of church

San Martino is a Romanesque-style, Roman Catholic church located on Via San Martino #48 in Tarquinia, province of Viterbo, region of Lazio, Italy.

== History and description ==
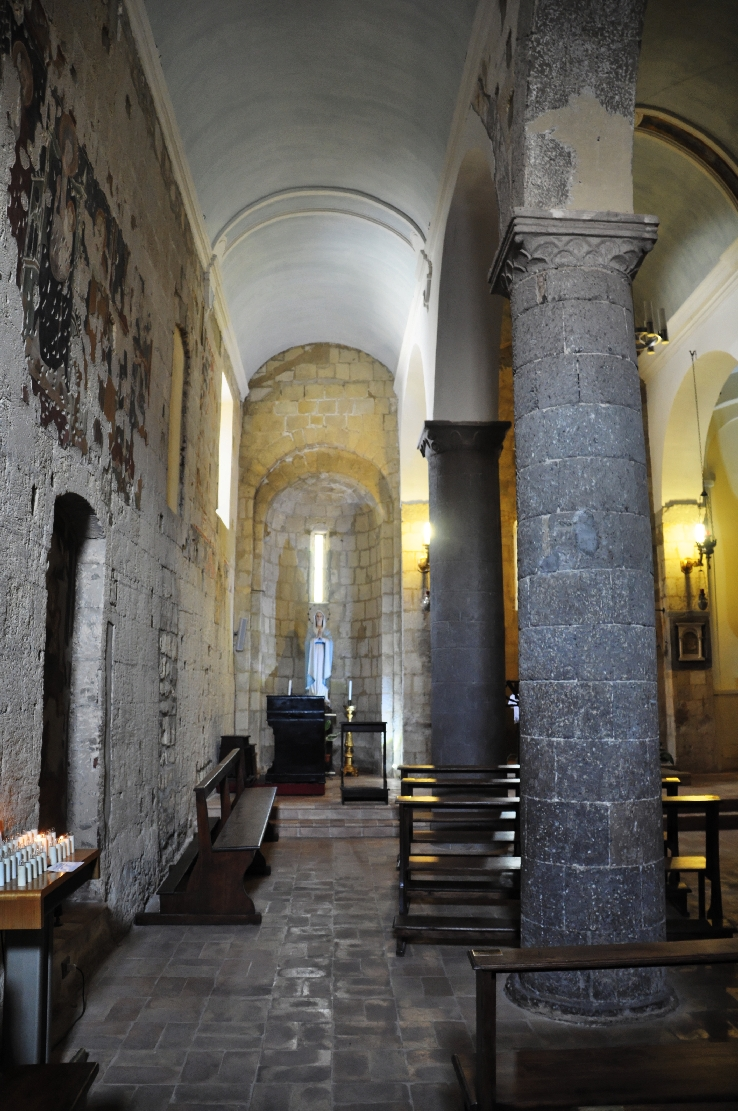
Interior along left nave

A church of this name is documented in the town since 1051, but more information does not arise until the 16th century, and in 1612 the parish was incorporated into the parish of Santi Maria e Margherita. The church has been refurbished over the ages, and the accumulated architecture on a Romanesque layout is eclectic. The nave has remnants of a 15th-century fresco depicting St Anne and the Virgin with Child.
