= San Pancrazio, Tarquinia =

Church building in Tarquinia, Italy

San Pancrazio is a Gothic-style, Roman Catholic church located on Via San Pancrazio #11 in Tarquinia, province of Viterbo, Lazio, central Italy. Now deconsecrated, the church is used for cultural events.

This was for many years the main church in town. It appears to have been constructed in the late 12th and early 13th centuries. In the 17th century it underwent refurbishment. Deconsecrated in the early 20th century, it was not reopened until after World War II, and now reponed by the comune for meetings, conferences, and concerts. The apse has a semi-circular Romanesque apse.
