= Gravisca =

Coordinates: 42°12′46″N 11°42′37″E

- Graviscae
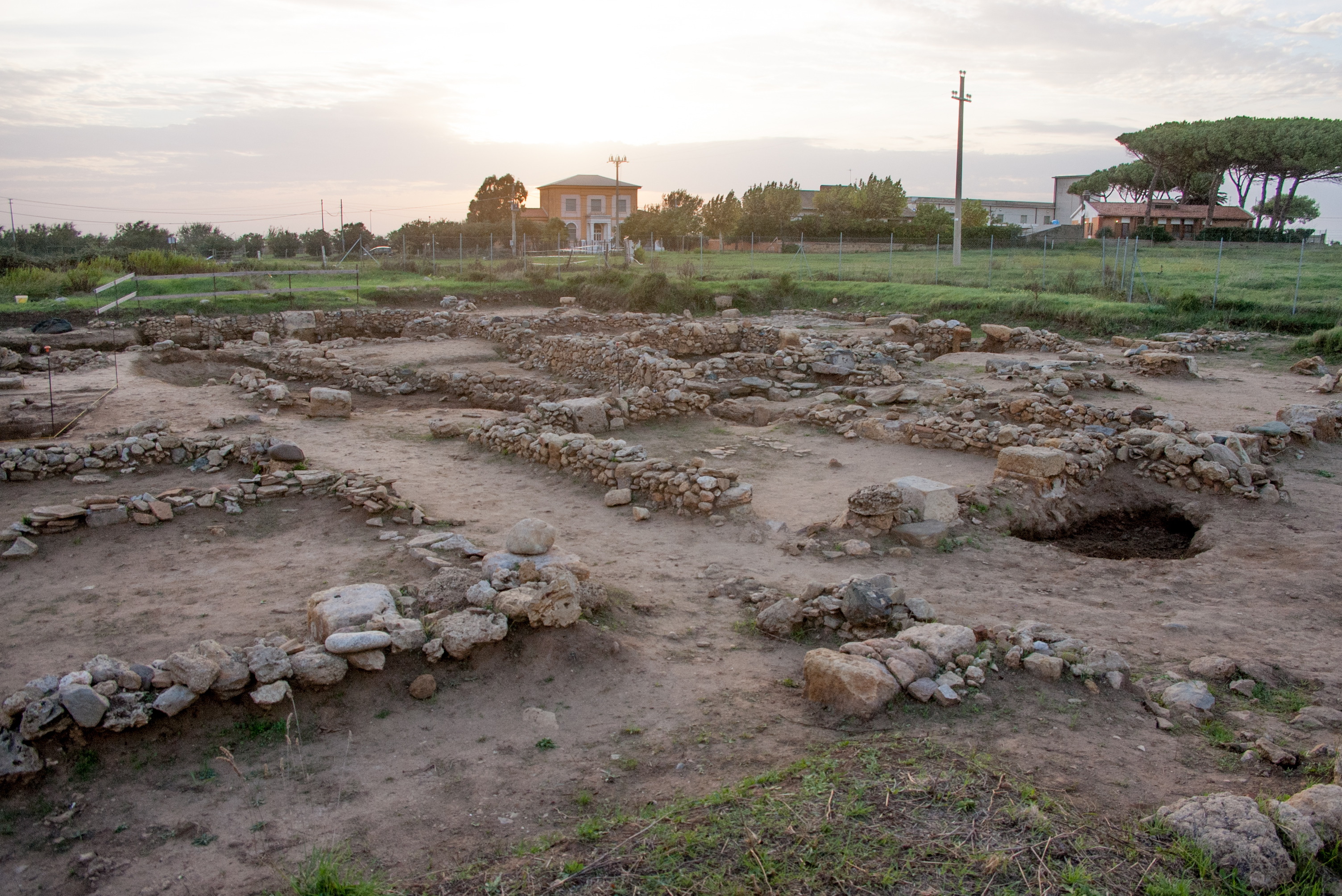
- The excavations at Gravisca, conducted by the University of Perugia.

- Location within Lazio
- Type: Port, Settlement
- Periods: Orientalizing period - Roman Empire
- Cultures: Etruscan
- Region: Lazio

Site notes
- Excavation dates: yes
- Archaeologists: Mario Torelli
- Condition: ruined
- Public access: no

Gravisca (Cravsca in Etruscan and Graviscae Latin) was the port of the Etruscan city of Tarquinii, situated 8 km west of the city center.

The Etruscan settlement, occupied ca. sixth to third centuries BC, had four principal occupational phases from ca. 600 to 250 B.C. It was superseded by the establishment of a colonia of Roman citizenship at the site in 181 BC. The port functioned as an emporion and there is ample evidence for merchants and perhaps Greek artisans based at the site. There was a Greek quarter at the city. The cults of numerous Greek gods, including Aphrodite, Hera, Demeter, and Apollo, are attested.

The port is mentioned by name in book 10, line 23 of the Aeneid.
