= Tarquinia =

Town in Lazio, Italy

- Comune
- Comune di Tarquinia
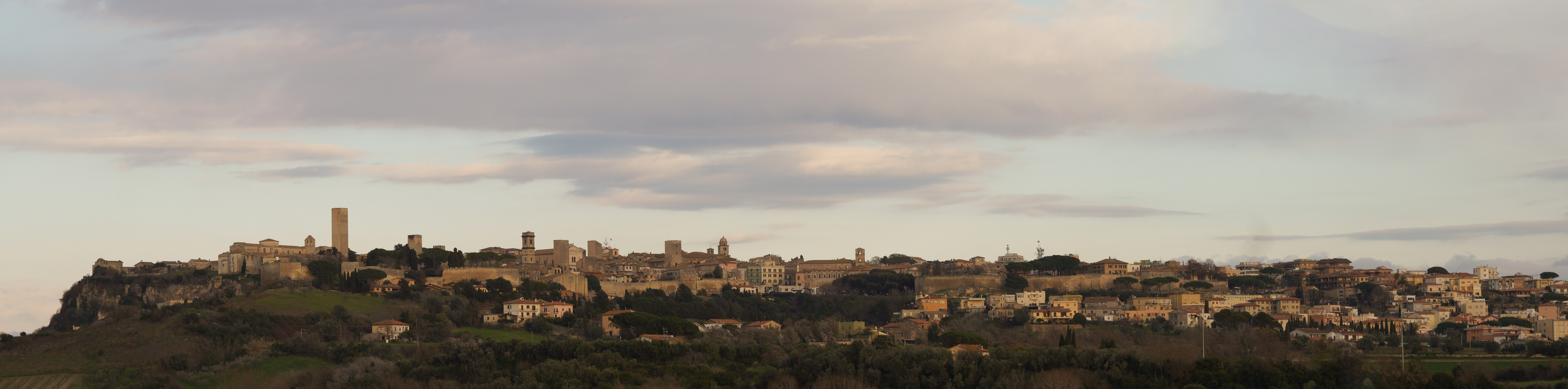
- View of Tarquinia

- Flag Coat of arms

- Location within Italy Location within Lazio
- Coordinates: 42°14′57″N 11°45′22″E
- Country: Italy
- Region: Lazio
- Province: Viterbo (VT)
- Frazioni: Tarquinia Lido

Government
  - Mayor: Francesco Sposetti

Area
  - Total: 279.34 km^{2} (107.85 sq mi)
- Elevation: 133 m (436 ft)

Population (2026)
  - Total: 15,862
  - Density: 56.784/km^{2} (147.07/sq mi)
- Demonym: Tarquiniesi
- Time zone: UTC+1 (CET)
  - Summer (DST): UTC+2 (CEST)
- Website: tarquinia.net

Tarquinia (Italian: [tarˈkwiːnja]), formerly known as Corneto, is a town and comune (municipality) in the Province of Viterbo in the region of Lazio in central Italy. The ancient burial grounds (necropoleis), dating from the Iron Age (9th century BC, or Villanovan period) to Roman times, were on the adjacent promontories including that of today's Tarquinia. It has 15,862 inhabitants.

It is renowned for its extensive Etruscan necropolises, which contain some of the most important painted tombs of the ancient world. In recognition of its cultural significance, Tarquinia was designated a UNESCO World Heritage Site as part of the Etruscan Necropolises of Cerveteri and Tarquinia.

The modern town was renamed in 1922 after the ancient city of Tarquinii (Latin) or Tarch(u)na (Etruscan). Although little remains above ground of the once-flourishing city, archaeological excavations continue to uncover important remnants of its Etruscan and Roman past.

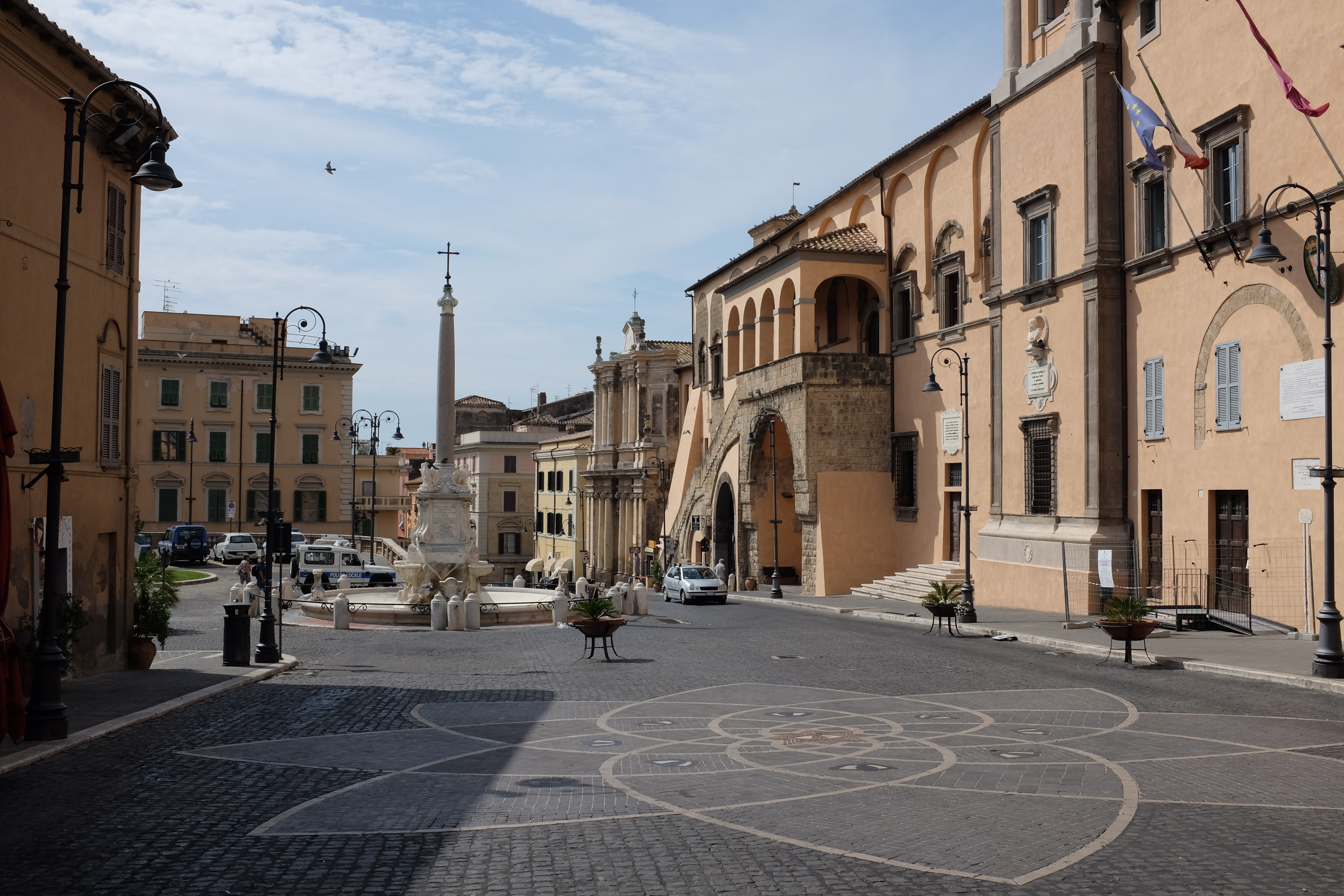
Tarquinia's town square, with the city hall (Palazzo della Luna Comunale) on the right.

== History ==
=== Etruscan city ===
Tarquinii (Etruscan Tarch(u)na) was one of the most ancient and important Etruscan cities; the ancient myths connected with Tarchuna (those of its eponymous founder Tarchon—the son or brother of Tyrrhenus—and of the infant oracle Tages, who gave the Etruscans the disciplina etrusca) all point to the antiquity and cultural importance of the city. Based on archaeological finds, Tarchuna eclipsed its neighbours well before the advent of written records. It is said to have already been a flourishing city when Demaratus of Corinth brought in Greek workmen. Descendants of Demaratus became kings of ancient Rome.

The impact of Etruscan culture on Rome was notably manifested during the reign of the fifth king, Lucius Tarquinius Priscus, who demonstrated his drive for power through military success against the Sabines and Latins, improvements to the Forum, and adoption of Etruscan royal dress. His successor, Lucius Tarquinius Superbus, played a crucial role in establishing key institutions fundamental to Rome's administrative and societal structure.

Numerous Roman religious rites and ceremonies derived from Tarchuna, and even in imperial times a collegium of sixty haruspices continued to exist there.

The emergence of Tarchuna as a trading power as early as the 8th Century BC was influenced by its control of mineral resources located in the Tolfa Hills to the south of the city and midway to the Caeretan port of Pyrgi.

In 509 BC, after the overthrow of the Roman monarchy, the family of Tarquinius Superbus went into exile in Caere. He sought to regain the throne at first by the Tarquinian conspiracy and, when that failed, by force of arms. He convinced the cities of Tarchuna and Veii to support him and led their armies against Rome in the Battle of Silva Arsia. Although the Roman army was victorious, it is recorded by Livy that the forces of Tarchuna fought well on the right wing, initially pushing back the Roman left wing. After the battle the forces of Tarchuna returned home.

At the end of the 5th century and during the first half of the 4th century BC a brief revival took place, both in the political and artistic sphere, probably under the ascendancy of the Spurinna family, whose members contributed to the renewed expansion of Tarchuna and the repopulation and growth of towns in the hinterland. The Spurinnas' tomb, known as the Tomba dell'Orco, is decorated with frescoes of a banquet uniting members of the family who are identified by inscriptions. The Spurinna family was prominent in Tarquinii up to the 1st century AD. Two fragmented slabs, known as the Elogia Tarquiniensis, pay tribute to Velthur Spurinnas and Aulus Spurinnas, and give a rare glimpse of Etruscan history, including the mention of one King Orgolnium of Caere, recalling the family name of Urgulanilla, which included among its members the wife of the emperor Claudius.

During this period, Tarchuna overtook Caere and other Etruscan cities in terms of power and influence. In this period colossal walls were built around the city in response to threats from the Celts and from Rome. Tarchuna, not affected by Celtic invasions, finally colonised all its previously held territories in about 385 BC. This new flourishing state allowed a rapid recovery of all activities. Large burial monuments decorated by paintings, with sarcophagi and funerary sculptures in stone, reflect the eminent social position of the new aristocratic classes, but several inscriptions on walls and sarcophagi, including the important Sarcophagus of Lars Pulenas, show the gradual process of an increasingly democratic transition was taking place.

However, during the 4th century BC when Tarchuna's expansion was at its peak, a bitter struggle with Rome took place. In 358 BC, the citizens of Tarchuna captured and put to death 307 Roman soldiers; the resulting war ended in 351 BC with a forty years' truce, renewed for a similar period in 308 BC.

=== Roman city ===
When Tarchuna came under Roman domination is uncertain, as is also the date at which it became a municipium; in 181 BC its port, Graviscae (modern Porto Clementino), in an unhealthy position on the coast (due to malaria from nearby marshes), became a Roman colonia that exported wine and had coral fisheries. Little is known about Tarquinii in Roman times, but the flax and forests of its extensive territory are mentioned by classical authors, and Tarquinii offered to furnish Scipio with sailcloth in 195 BC. A bishop of Tarquinii is mentioned in 456 AD.

=== Post-Roman era ===
The ancient city had shrunk to a small fortified settlement on the "Castellina" location during the early Middle Ages, while the more strategically placed Corneto (possibly the "Corito" mentioned in Roman sources) grew progressively to become the major city of the lower Maremma sea coast, especially after the destruction of the port of Centumcellae (modern Civitavecchia). The last historic references to Tarquinii are from around 1250, and the last remains were destroyed in 1305.

The importance of Tarquinii to archaeologists lies mainly in its necropolis, situated to the southeast of the medieval town, on the hill named "Monterozzi". The oldest tombs are tombe a pozza, or shaft graves, containing the ashes of the dead in an urn. The oldest of them is probably pre-Etruscan; in some of these tombs are hut-shaped urns, many of which contain well-preserved paintings of various periods; some show close kinship to archaic Greek art, while others are more recent, and one may belong to the middle of the 4th century BC. Sarcophagi from these tombs, some showing traces of painting, were preserved in the municipal museum, as were numerous Greek vases, bronzes and other objects.

The name of Corneto was changed to Tarquinia in 1922. Reversion to historical place names (not always accurately), was a frequent phenomenon under the Fascist Government of Italy as part of the nationalist campaign to evoke past glories.

== Demographics ==
Historical population
Year	Pop.	±%
1871	4,326	—
1881	4,998	+15.5%
1901	5,849	+17.0%
1911	6,617	+13.1%
1921	7,395	+11.8%
1931	7,966	+7.7%
1936	8,118	+1.9%
1951	10,552	+30.0%
1961	11,840	+12.2%
1971	12,364	+4.4%
1981	13,176	+6.6%
1991	14,020	+6.4%
2001	15,162	+8.1%
2011	16,016	+5.6%
2021	16,075	+0.4%
Source: ISTAT

As of 2026, the population is 15,862, of which 48.9% are male, and 51.1% are female. Minors make up 13.0% of the population, and seniors make up 27.9%.

=== Immigration ===
As of 2025, immigrants make up 8.1% of the population. The 5 largest foreign countries of birth are Romania, Ukraine, Tunisia, India, and Argentina.

== Main sights ==
The Etruscan and Roman city is situated on the long plateau of La Civita to the north of the current town.

Tarquinia, Etruscan Necropolis of Monterozzi
UNESCO World Heritage Site
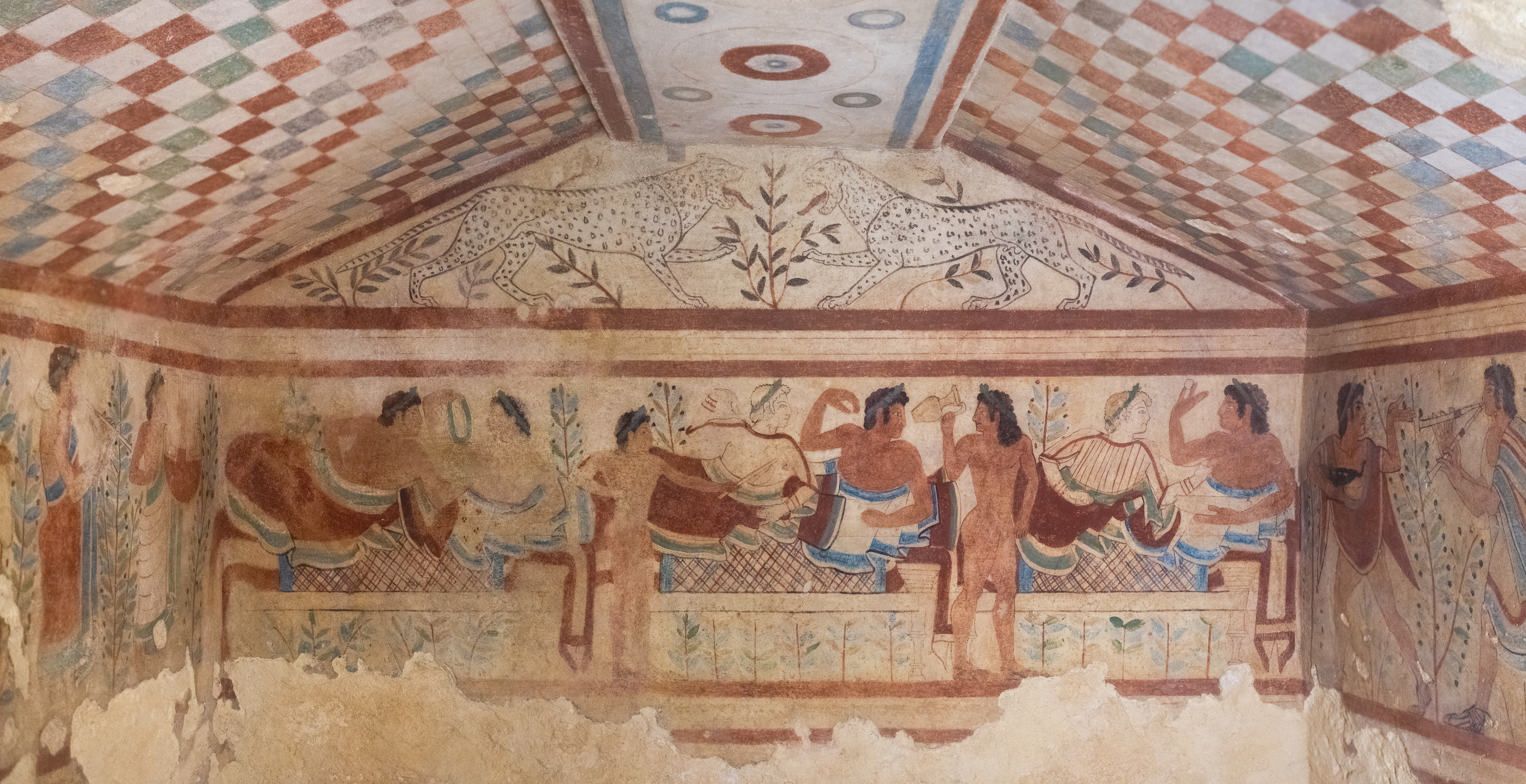
- A fresco in the Etruscan Tomb of the Leopards
- Interactive map of Tarquinia, Etruscan Necropolis of Monterozzi
- Part of: Etruscan Necropolises of Cerveteri and Tarquinia
- Criteria: Cultural: (i)(iii)(iv)
- Reference: 1158-002
- Inscription: 2004 (28th Session)
- Area: 129.36 ha (319.7 acres)
- Buffer zone: 3,108.0701 ha (7,680.208 acres)
- Coordinates: 42°15′1.60″N 11°46′11.50″E

=== Etruscan necropolis of Monterozzi ===
The main necropolis of Tarchuna, part of which can be visited today, is the Monterozzi necropolis with some 6,000 tombs, at least 200 of which include beautiful wall paintings, and many of which were tumulus tombs with chambers carved in the rock below.

The painted scenes are of a quality virtually unrivalled elsewhere in the Etruscan world and give a valuable insight into the secretive world of the Etruscans which is rarely documented. They show banquets with dances and music, sporting events, occasional erotic and mythical scenes. In the late period underworld demons escorting the dead on their journey to the beyond including scenes in the nether world were depicted, and also processions of magistrates and other symbols of the rank of the eminent members of the families buried there.

Famous tombs include the Tomb of the Bulls, Tomb of the Augurs and the Tomb of the Leopards.

During the second half of the 4th century sculpted and painted sarcophagi of nenfro, marble and alabaster came into use. They were deposited on rock-carved benches or against the walls in the by then very large underground chambers. Sarcophagi continued until the second century and are found in such numbers at Tarquinia that they must have been manufactured locally.

=== The Ancient City (La Civita) ===
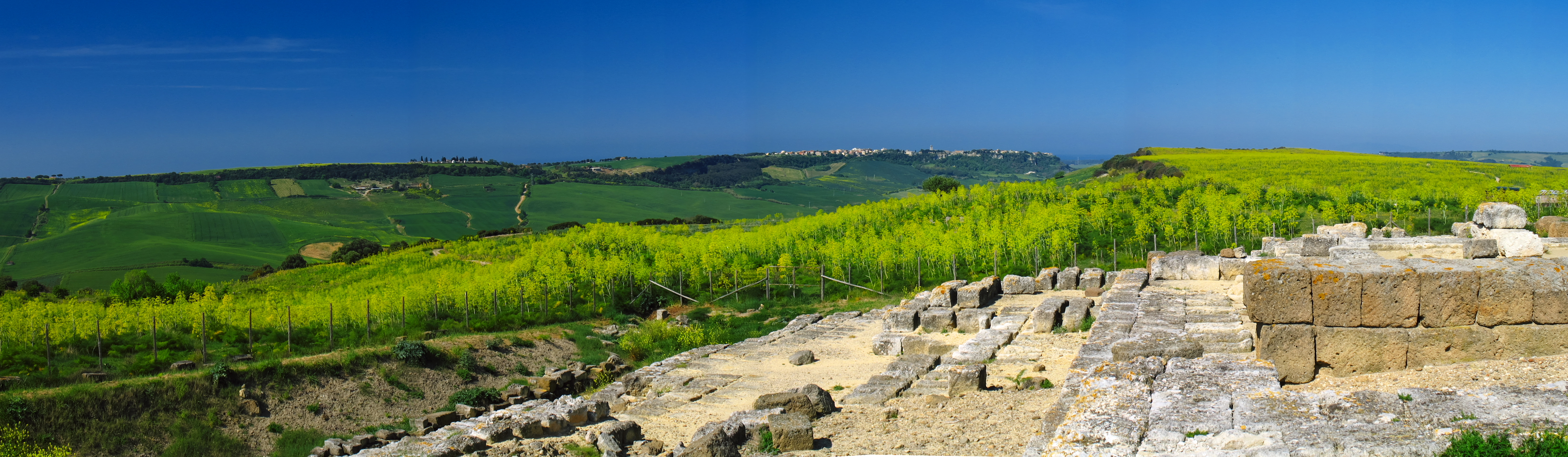
View of Tarquinia from Ara della Regina

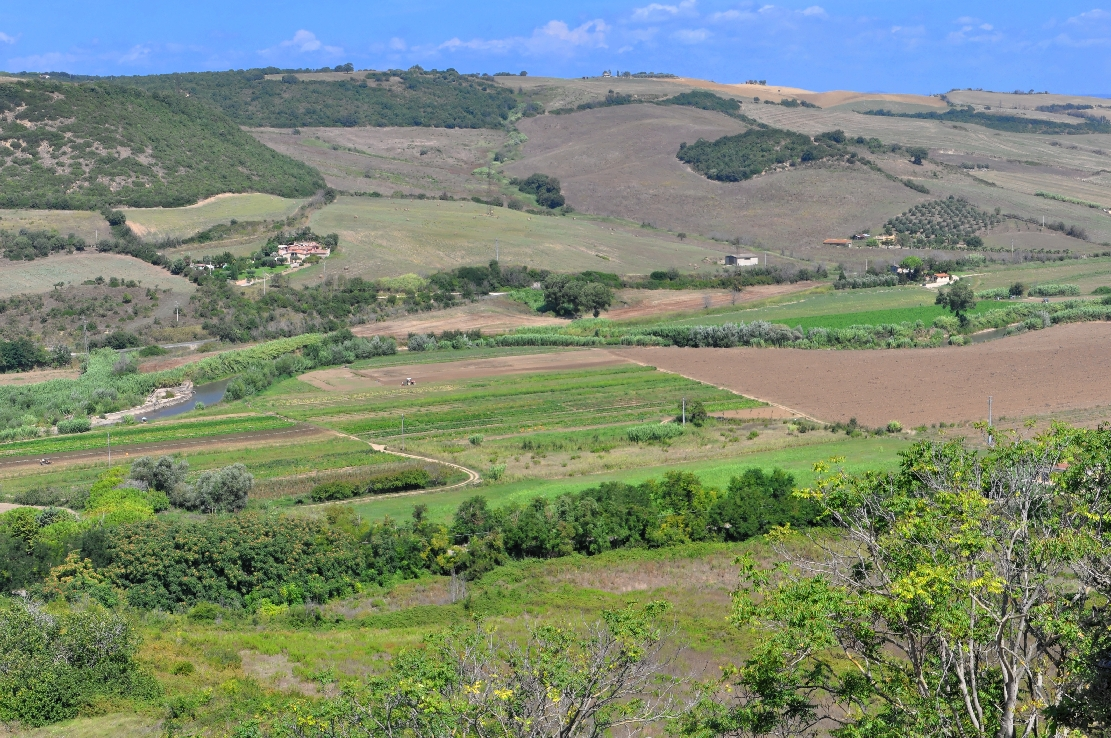
Site of the ancient city on the plateau of La Civita opposite the modern town

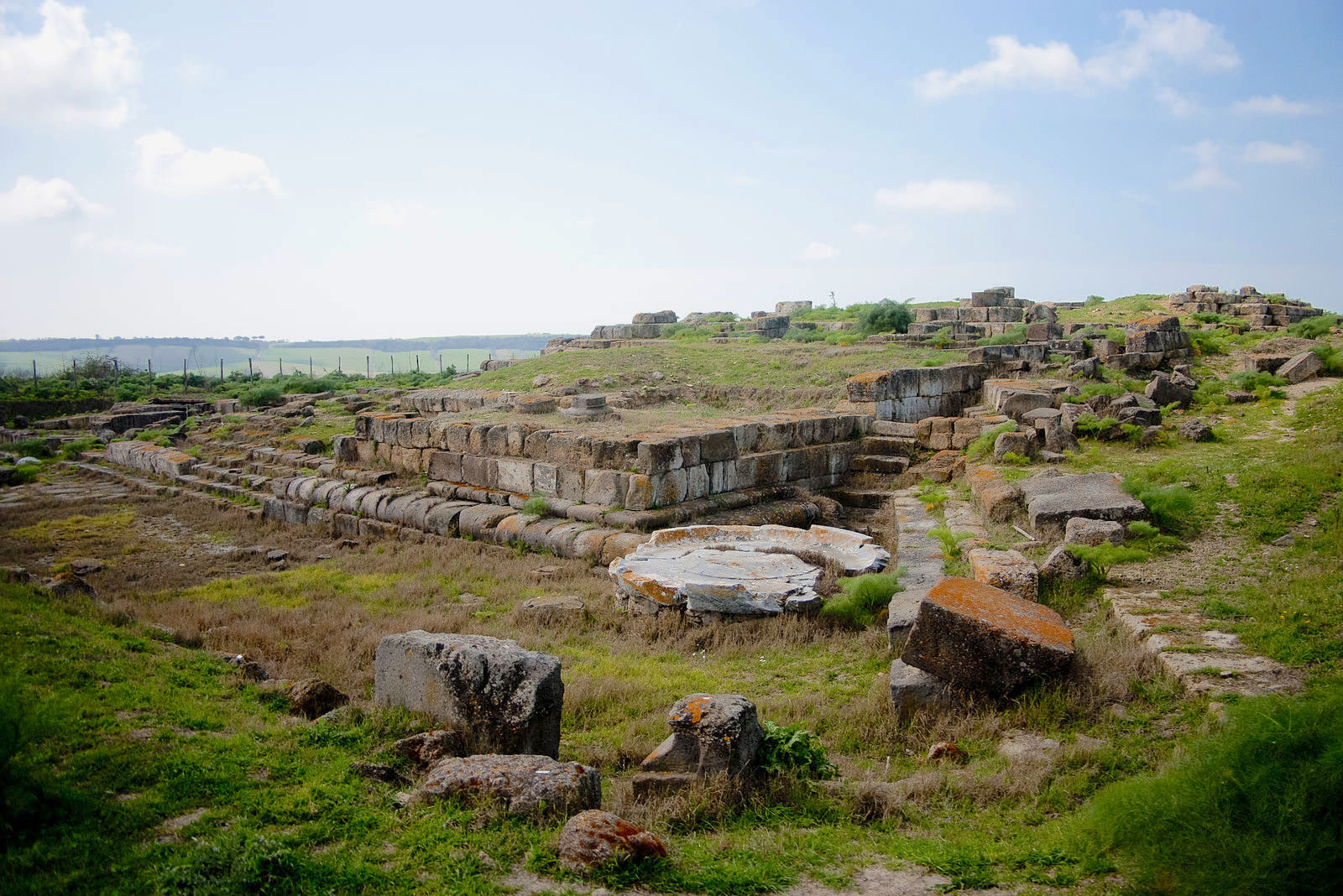
Ara della Regina

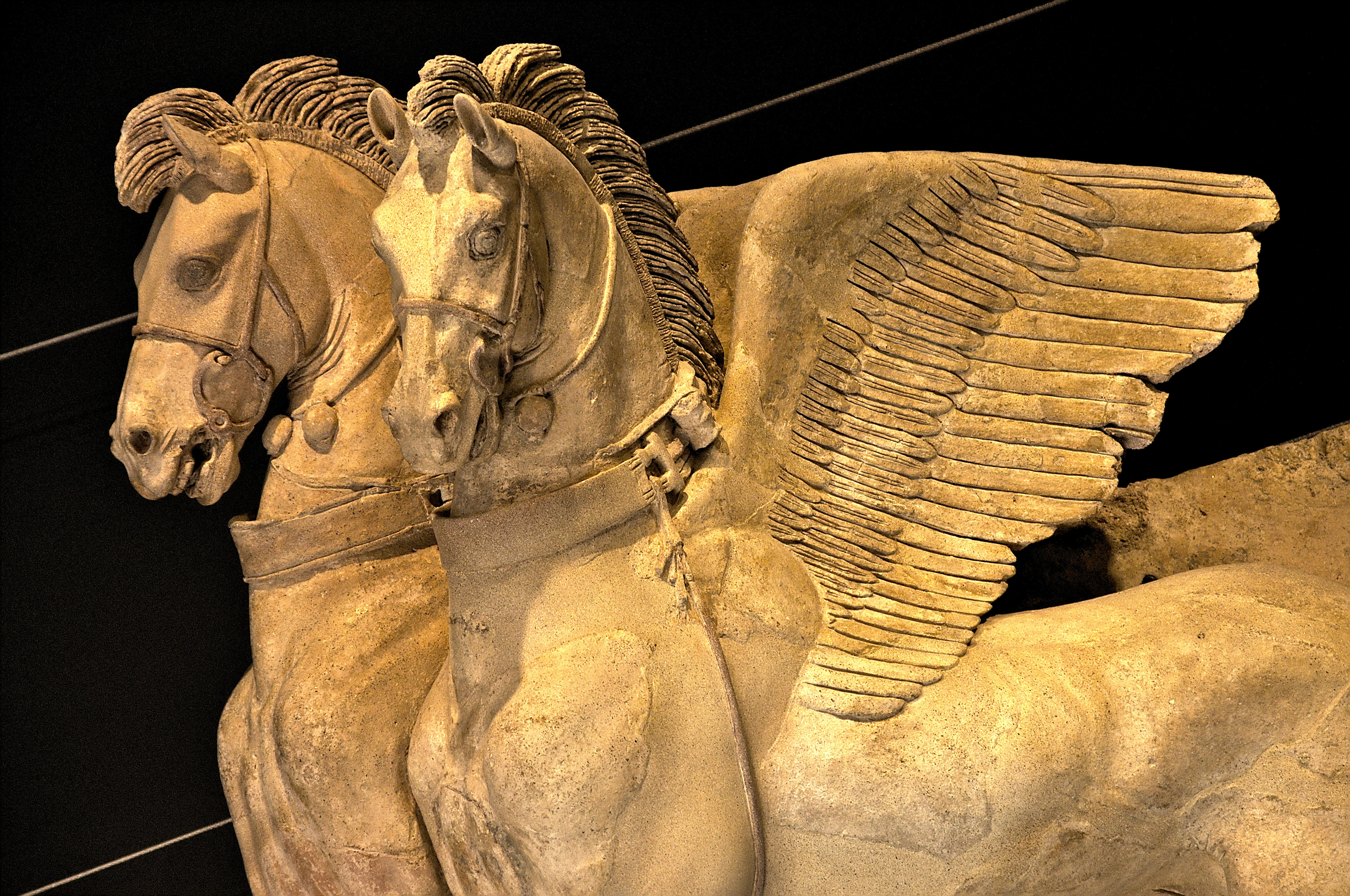
Horses from the Ara della Regina

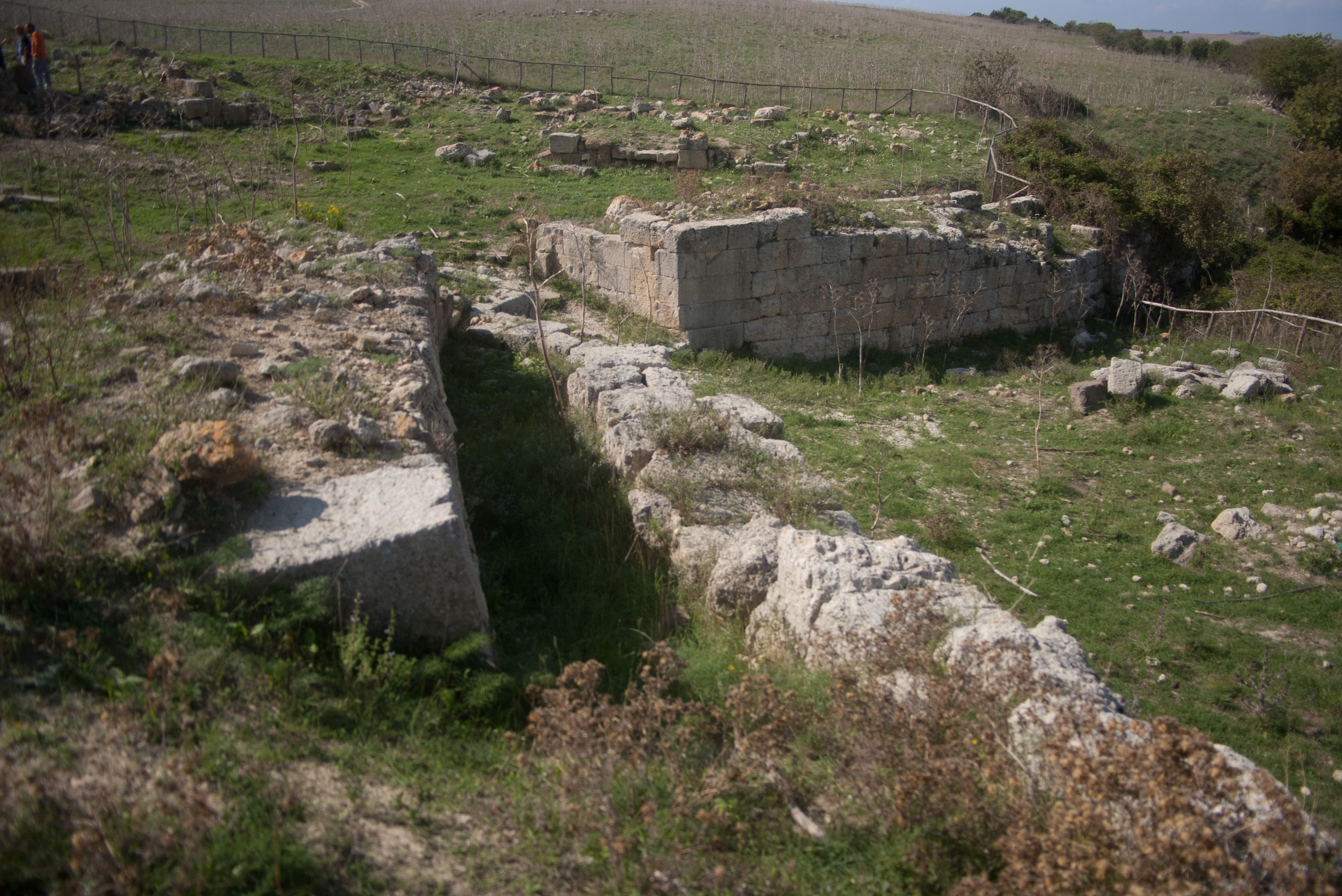
City gate of "Porta Romanelli"

The city towered above the Marta valley and was about 6 km from the sea. La Civita is made up of two adjoining plateaux, the pian di Civita and the pian della Regina, joined by a narrow saddle.

==== The Temple Ara della Regina ====
Measuring c. 44 × 25 m and dating to c. 4th–3rd century BC, it was built in tufa with wooden structures and decorations, notably the famous and exquisite frieze of winged horses in terracotta that is considered a masterpiece of Etruscan art.

==== City walls ====
The large walls were built during the city's most prosperous period in the 6th century BC and measured about 8 km long, enclosing 135 ha, and long parts of the northern section are visible.

=== Other sights ===
- Tarquinia National Museum: with a large collection of archaeological finds, it is housed in the Renaissance Palazzo Vitelleschi, begun in 1436 and completed around 1480–1490.

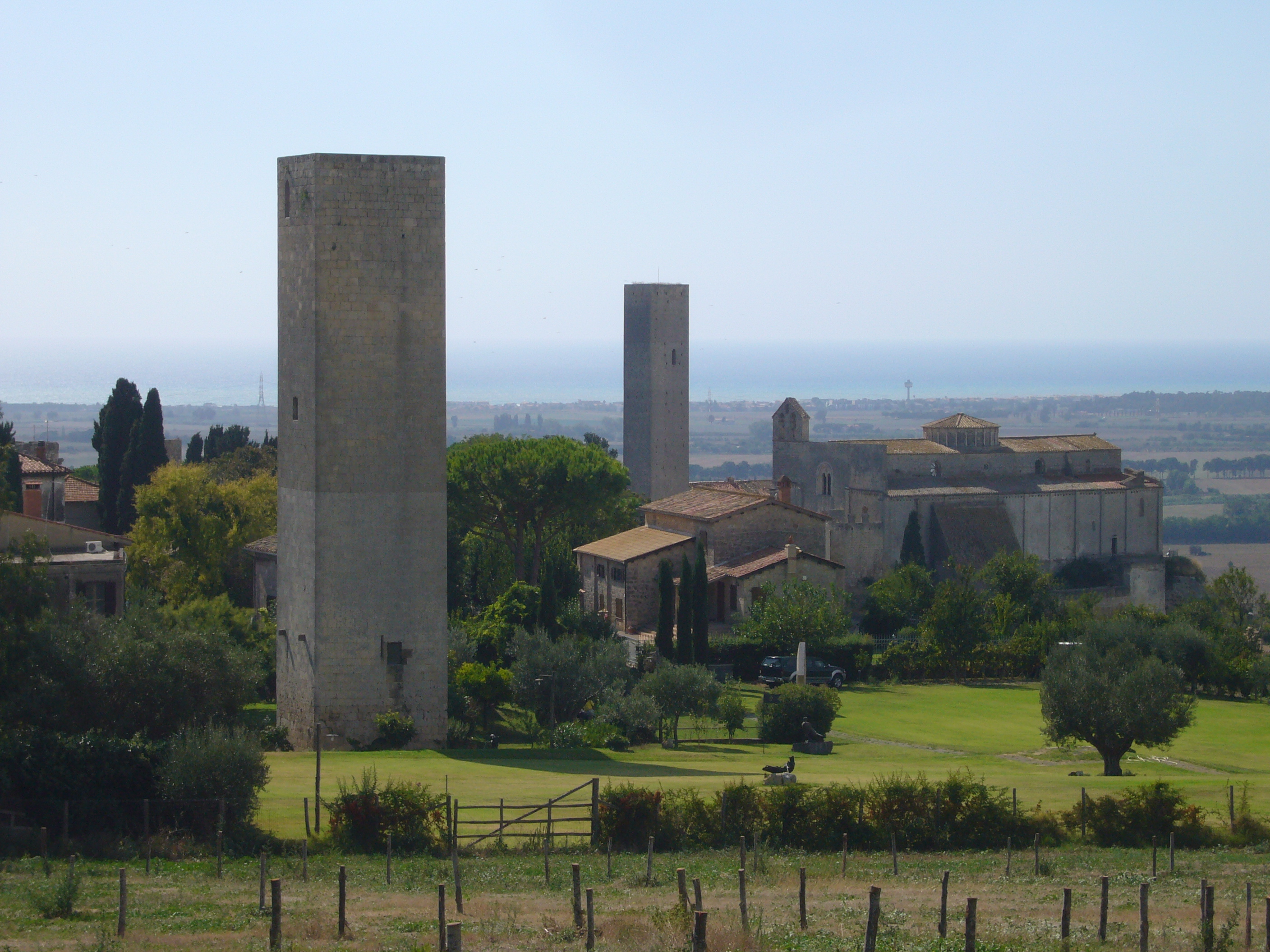
The church of Santa Maria di Castello.

- Santa Maria di Castello: church built in 1121–1208 with Lombard and Cosmatesque influences. The façade has a small bell tower and three entrances. The interior has a nave and two aisles, divided by massive pilasters with palaeo-Christian capitals and friezes. Noteworthy are also the rose-window in the nave and the several marble works by Roman masters.
- Tarquinia Cathedral: once in Romanesque-Gothic style but rebuilt after the 1643 fire, it has maintained from the original edifice the 16th-century frescoes in the presbytery, by Antonio del Massaro
- San Pancrazio: Gothic-Romanesque church
- San Giacomo and Santissima Annunziata, churches showing different Arab and Byzantine influences
- San Martino: 12th-century Romanesque church
- San Giovanni Battista: 12th-century church with an elegant rose-window in the simple façade.
- Communal Palace, in Romanesque style, begun in the 13th century and restored in the 16th
- The numerous medieval towers, including that of Dante Alighieri
- Palazzo dei Priori. The façade, remade in Baroque times, has a massive external staircase. The interior has a fresco cycle from 1429.

== Winemaking ==
The Italian wine DOC of Tarquinia produces red and white frizzante style wine. The grapes are limited to a harvest yield of 12 tonnes/ha with finished wines needing a minimum 10.5% alcohol level. The reds are a blend of at least 60% Sangiovese and/or Montepulciano, up to 25% Cesanese and up to 30% of other local red grape varieties such as Abbuoto. The whites are composed of at least 50% Trebbiano and/or Giallo, up to 35% Malvasia and up to 30 other local grape varieties with the exception of Pinot grigio that is specifically excluded from the DOC wines of Tarquinia.

== International relations ==
=== Twin towns - sister cities ===
- Jaruco, Cuba
- Rabat, Malta

== Sources ==
- R. Leighton, Tarquinia, an Etruscan City (Duckworth, London, 2004).
- This work in turn cites:
  - L. Dasti, Notizie storiche archeologiche di Tarquinia e Corneto (Rome, 1878)
  - G. Dennis, Cities and Cemeteries of Etruria (London, 1883), i. 301 sqq.
  - Notizie degli Scavi, passim, especially 1885, 513 sqq.
  - E. Bormann in Corp. Inscr. Lai., xi. (Berlin, 1888), p. 510 sqq.
  - G. Körte, "Etrusker" in Pauly-Wissowa, Realencyklopädie, vi. 730 sqq.
