= Tomb of Hunting and Fishing =

Coordinates: 42°15′0″N 11°46′7″E

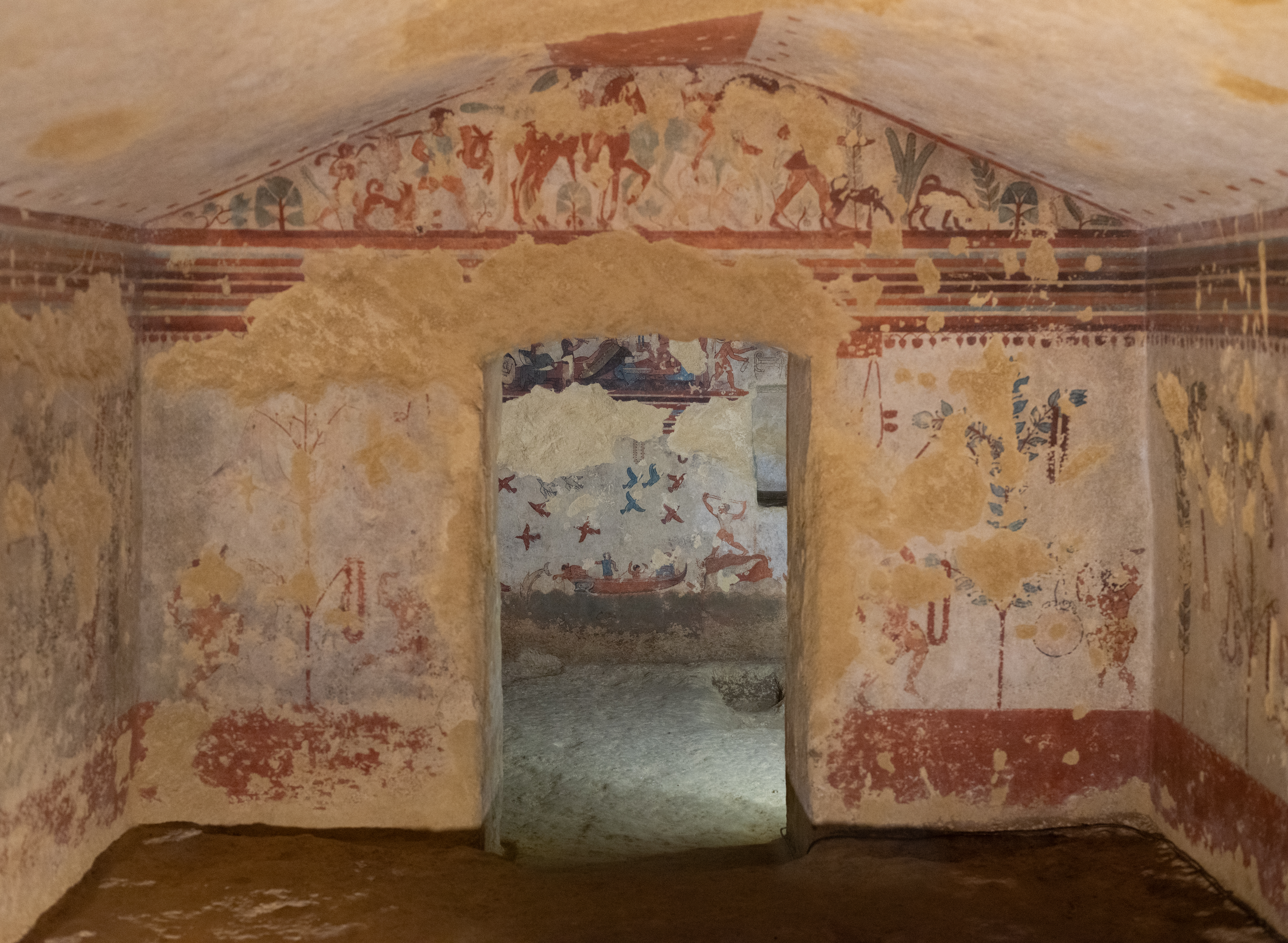
Tomb of Hunting and Fishing

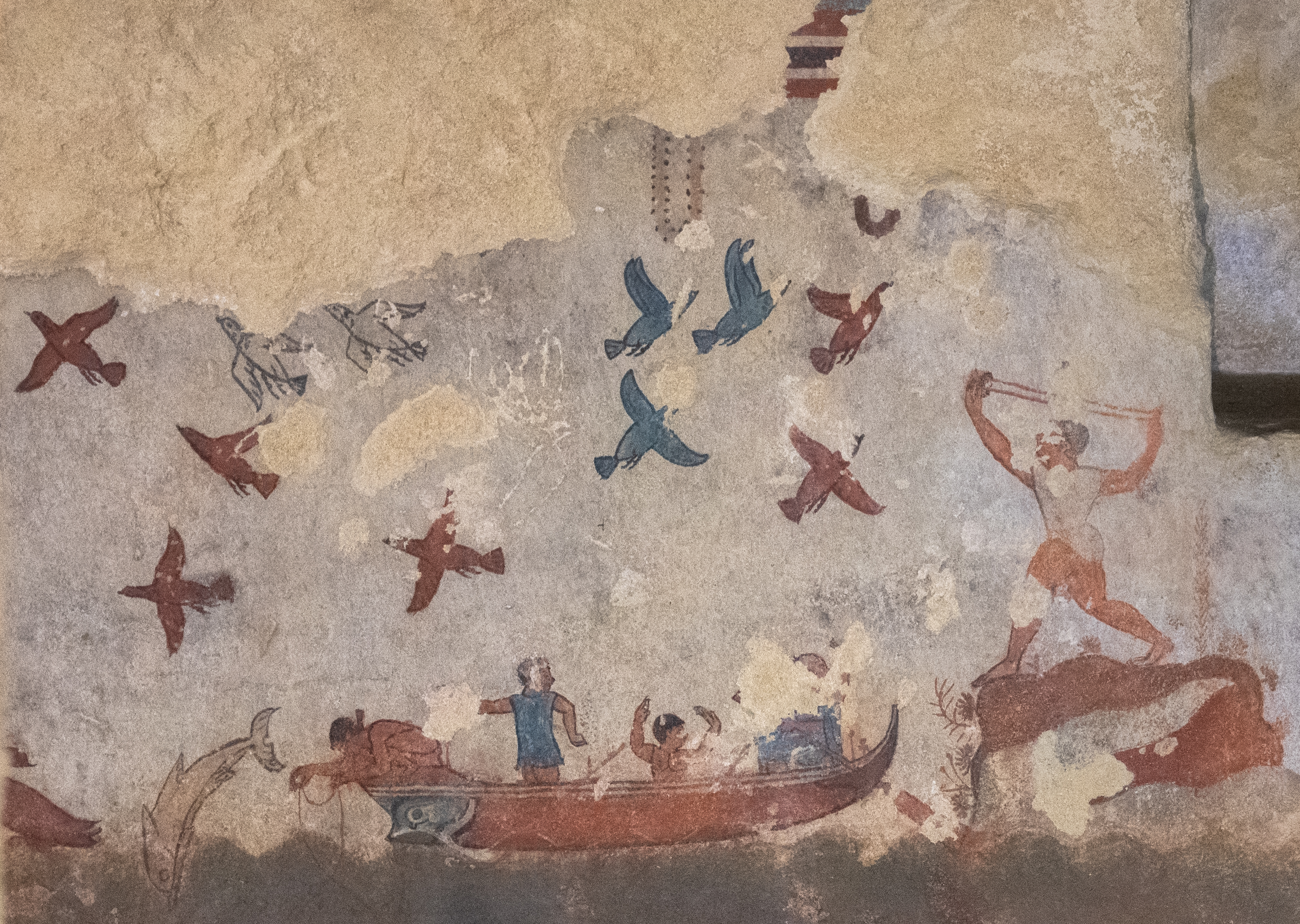
Detail of the fresco on the back wall of the main chamber

The Tomb of Hunting and Fishing (Italian: Tomba della Caccia e Pesca), formerly known as the Tomb of the Hunter (Tomba del Cacciatore), is an Etruscan tomb in the Necropolis of Monterozzi near Tarquinia, Lazio, Italy. It was discovered in 1873 and has been dated variously to about 530–520 BC, 520 BC, 510 BC or 510–500 BC. Stephan Steingräber calls it "unquestionably one of the most beautiful and original of the Tarquinian tombs from the Late Archaic period." R. Ross Holloway emphasizes the reduction of humans to small figures in a large natural environment. There were no precedents for this in Ancient Greek art or in the Etruscan art it influenced. It was a major development in the history of ancient painting.

== Description ==
The entrance to the tomb leads to the antechamber, which has a doorway to the main chamber opposite the entrance. The wall frescoes of the antechamber show figures which are almost naked, apparently partaking in a Dionysian ritual dance. They are in a grove which is decorated with ribbons, wreaths, mirrors and cistae. Reclining satyrs with rhytoi appear in the gable of the entry wall. They too are an example of the influence of the cult of Dionysus on the Etruscan religion and cult of the dead. The gable of the back wall shows a hunting scene. Hunters and dogs return with quarry in a near-tropical landscape with lively vegetation.

In the gable of the back wall of the main chamber is a fresco of a banquet scene. A well-dressed man and woman recline on couches. They are surrounded by two naked cupbearers, an aulos player, drinking vessels, wreaths and birds. There are also two young women who weave wreaths. The frescoes for which the tomb is known best are located below the gables of the main chamber. They show seascapes with cliffs, boats with apotropaic eyes, fishermen with harpoons and nets, hunters with slings, water birds and leaping dolphins. The back wall has a niche for a cremation burial.

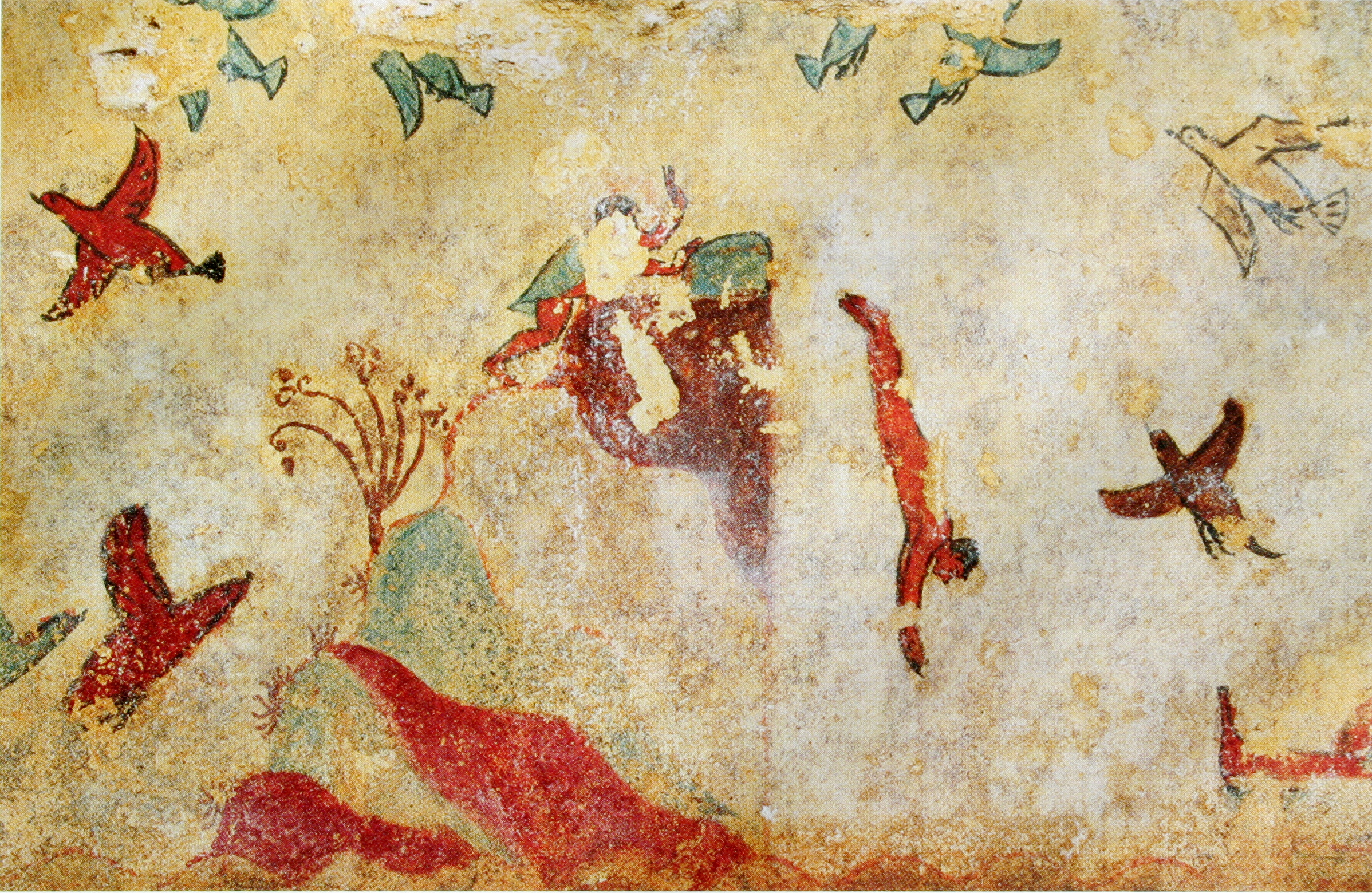
Diver scene. Fresco. Tomb of Hunting and Fishing. Dated roughly to between 530 – 500BCE.

A scene on one fresco shows a youth climbing towards a cliff while a second youth is diving down the cliff face towards the water below. This scene of the diver occurs again approximately thirty years later in the Tomb of the Diver near the ancient Greek city Poseidonia. This second diver scene in the tomb of the diver is dated to around 470 BCE. It is now thought that the frescoes from that tomb probably emulated older Etruscan designs. This countered the now discredited opinion of art historians who thought that the Etruscans only copied and never influenced Greek art.

== Interpretation ==
According to Troy Henderson Jr. hunting and banqueting were typical activities for the Etruscan aristocracy. The scenes showing those activities would have served as status symbols for those interred in the tomb. The man and woman depicted in the banquet scene were apparently the husband and wife buried in the tomb. Possibly the two young women were their daughters. The sea scenes not only represent the natural environment of Tarquinia's shores, but also the long journey over the sea to the afterlife. The diver should also be understood in that sense, as a leap from this world to the underworld. For Janson, the large hunter with a slingshot on the back wall of the main chamber might be a demon of death. The associations with Dionysus carry a funerary context as well. He was not only the god of wine, but also the god of vegetation, connecting him with death and resurrection.

While the frescoes of the tomb might seem to be unique for their treatment of scale, Holloway argues they are in fact a logical development from earlier tomb painting. The frescoes of the bulls above the two doorways in Tomb of the Bulls show bulls and humans of a similar small scale. If those frescoes were not restricted by the limited space they occupied, the effect could have been similar to the frescoes in the Tomb of Hunting and Fishing.

=== Illusionistic tomb decoration ===
The tomb's imagery is interpreted more literally by Holloway. Like several other contemporary painted tombs in the Necropolis of Monterozzi, the frescoes in the Tomb of Hunting and Fishing followed the convention of illusionistic tomb painting. This style of decoration was only practiced in Tarquinia and came in use around 525 BC.

The tomb paintings conforming to this style consisted of two elements. First, they depicted architectural details of an open pavilion, which would have been erected near the tomb to host the funeral banquet. Second, they depicted the funeral celebrations of the Etruscans. The artists aimed to recreate the view of the celebrations from the pavilion. This would allow the shades of the deceased to witness and participate in these ceremonies performed in their honor.

In the case of the Tomb of Hunting and Fishing, Holloway thinks the frescoes of the seascapes should be interpreted as the distant view from the pavilion. He notes that the Tyrrhenian Sea is visible to the west from the elevated terrain of the Necropolis of Monterozzi. This is similar to how the banqueters look down towards the seascapes from the gable of the main chamber's back wall. This is combined with the scenes in the antechamber, which show a funeral dance.

This motif of the panoramic distant vista from the pavilion recurs later in the Tomb of the Ship, but was then abandoned. The "Tarquinian school" of illusionistic tomb painting ultimately fell out of use after the fifth century BC as well. It would take more than four hundred years for illusionistic tomb painting to be reborn in Roman art.

== See also ==
- Etruscan art
- Tomb of the Augurs
- Tomb of the Bulls
- Tomb of the Dancers
- Tomb of the Diver
- Tomb of the Leopards
- Tomb of the Triclinium
