= Tomb of the Augurs =

Etruscan burial chamber

- Tomba degli Àuguri (Italian)
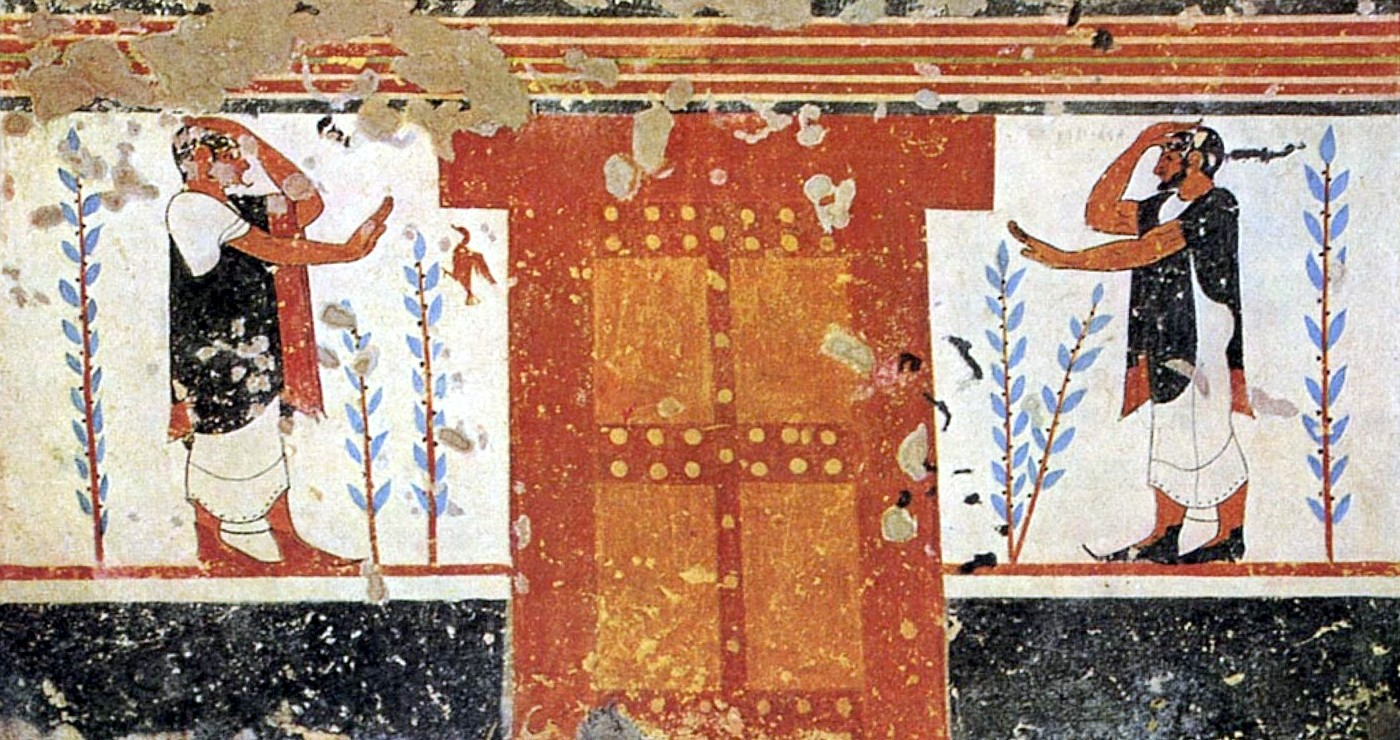

- Location within Italy
- 42°15′02″N 11°46′12″E
- Type: Necropolis
- Location: Tarquinia, Lazio, Italy
- Region: Southern Etruria

History
- Built: 6th century BC

Site notes
- Management: Soprintendenza per i Beni Archeologici dell'Etruria Meridionale
- Website: Museum and Necropolis of Tarquinia and Cerveteri

UNESCO World Heritage Site
- Type: Cultural
- Criteria: i, iii, iv
- Reference no.: 1158
- Region: Europe and North America

The Tomb of the Augurs (Italian: Tomba degli Àuguri) is an Etruscan burial chamber so called because of a misinterpretation of one of the fresco figures on the right wall thought to be a Roman priest known as an augur. The tomb is located within the Necropolis of Monterozzi near Tarquinia, Lazio, Italy, and dates to around 530-520 BC. This tomb is one of the first in Tarquinia to have figural decoration on all four walls of its main or only chamber, as well as a painted ceiling. The wall decoration was frescoed between 530-520 BC by an Ionian Greek painter, perhaps from Phocaea, whose style was associated with that of the Northern Ionic workers active in Elmali. This tomb is also the apparent first time we see the depictions of funerary ritual take precedent over mythology. Many of the figures depicted in the frieze, specifically those on the left and front walls, have been lost as the frescos have deteriorated over time from exposure. The entrance wall has figures placed on it, yet because of deterioration, no one can say for certain who or what these figures are and the actions that they are depicting.

== Frescoes ==
=== Ceiling ===
There are generally four different surviving ceiling patterns from tombs created in the 5th-6th century BCE found in Tarquinia. Three of these are undoubtedly reminiscent of common textile patterns found across Italy around this time. The ceiling from the Tomb of the Augurs falls into this category, and has been assigned to that of a Four Dot Rosettes pattern. The red and blue textile pattern is split down the middle by a thick red line, outlined by two thin ones on either side. Scholars have interpreted that the ceiling pattern is meant to symbolize a fabric tent, to give shelter to the funerary proceedings regarding the deceased. Additionally, the tent is used as a method of breaking up space and creating separate areas in which the frescoes take place, presumably far away from where the false door is intended to be.

=== Entrance Wall ===
The frescoes on the entrance wall are unfortunately almost entirely chipped away, yet scholars have still made efforts to hypothesize on what they might have depicted. The most commonly accepted one is that of it being acroamatic scenes in respect to the deceased. Scholars have interpreted that Acroamata, in ancient Rome, likely related to activities regarding safeguarded oral traditions, whether it be singing, reading, or performing in any other vocal manner.

=== Rear Wall ===
On the center of the rear wall a painted door is placed. This has been interpreted by scholars as a symbolic door or portal to the Underworld that acts as a barrier between the kingdom of the living and of the dead, being a common motif found in Greco-Roman antiquity, which has been described as a "false door" throughout scholarship. This motif has been viewed as a method of safe transition from the over to the underworld.

Two figures on either side of the door each extend one arm towards the door and raise the other to their forehead in a gesture of salutation, clemency, and mourning. Scholars have interpreted these two men as either augurs or mourners who are relatives of the deceased. The inscription accompanying these men contains the words Tanasar and Apastanasar, which denotes them as being the ritual leaders for the funerary proceedings, as well having some sort of kin relation to the deceased- who can be referred to as a lanista (a man who purchased and kept gladiators). Above the door shows a lion and leopard killing a deer.

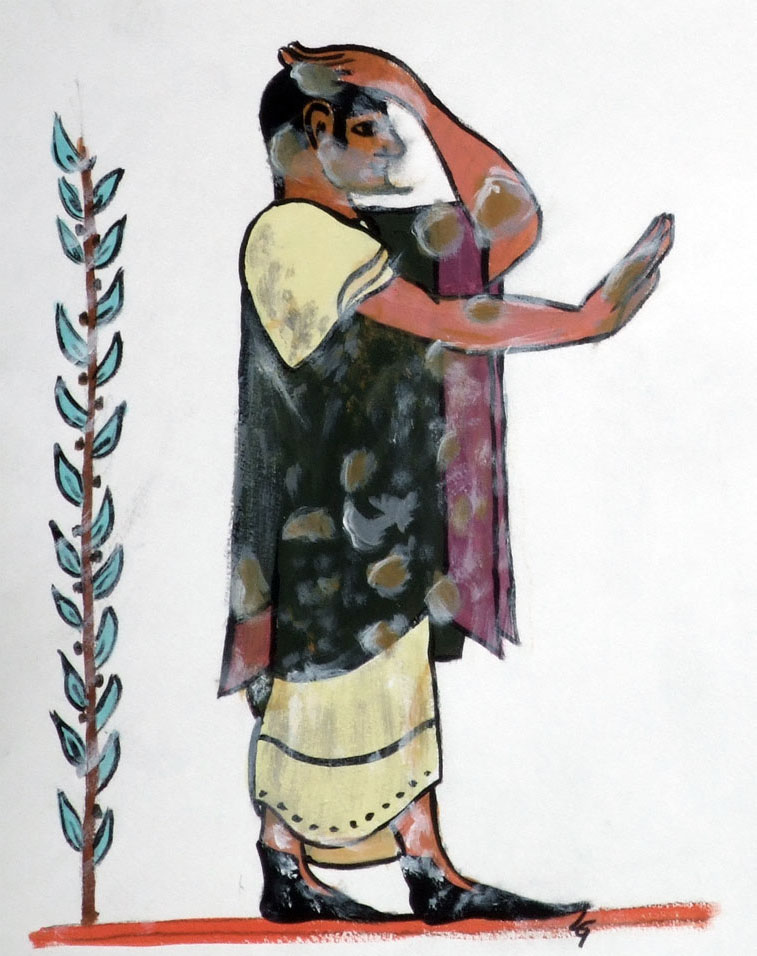
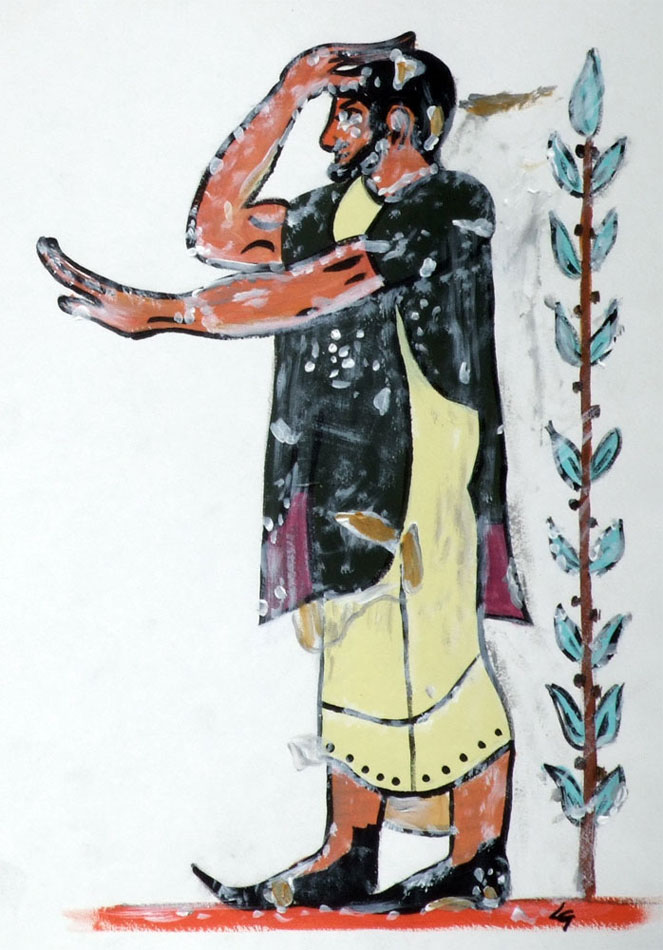
(False Door)

=== Right Wall ===
The whole right wall depicts the funerary games in honor of the deceased. Funerary games were a tradition among many ancient societies, which is emphasized and illustrated to modern readers from Homer's description in the Iliad of the contests staged at the funeral of Patroclus. Homer writes:

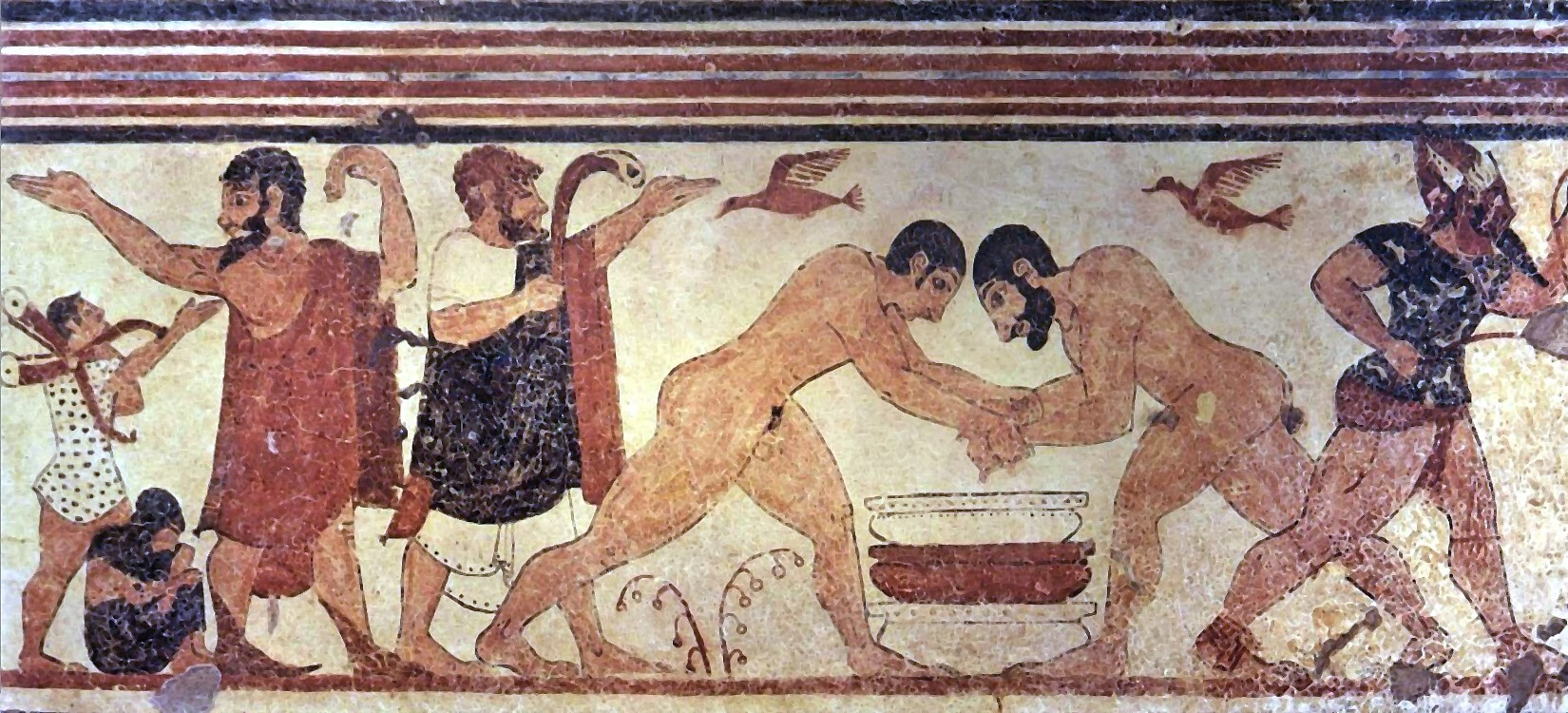
Wrestlers depicted on the Tomb of the Augurs, late 6th century BC, Tarquinia

"Wrestling is the third event. Fairly typical, the prizes are a tripod [three 3-footed cauldrons given as gifts] worth 12 oxen for first prize, and a woman worth 4 oxen for the loser."

This wrestling scene that Homer describes in the Iliad can be seen in the central motif of the right wall. It is also important to note the Etruscan funerary games, often bloody and deadly in nature, are seen as the original gladiatorial games as stated by the Romans. As a result, this part of Etruscan culture was inherited by the Romans into their own culture as a precursor to the spectacle of gladiatorial combat.

On the far end of the wall, closest to the rear wall, depicts a man wearing a purple tebenna, common Etruscan male robe, whose color alludes to the man being of elevated stature. The man is looking over his shoulder and gestures with a salutary pose to his two attendants, two figures of shorter stature. One attendant carries a folding stool, the official seat of the man's high office, and the other attendant is huddled on the ground with a hood covering his head. Many scholars interpret this end of the motif of the crouched attendant as weeping/mourning for his master, which leads scholars to conclude that the man in the purple robes is most likely the deceased coming to watch his funeral games.

In the center of the right wall shows the funerary game of wrestling in honor of the deceased. Depicted are two wrestlers – one younger and one older – who are wrestling in the Greek style [naked so no grabbing hold of any piece of clothing can take place]. The younger wrestler is identified as having no beard and having a slimmer torso while the older wrestler has a beard, an identifying marker for advanced age in a male, and a thicker upper body. Placed between the two wrestlers are three bowls of different colors, perhaps representing a silver, bronze and copper bowl, that are positioned on top of each other and are most likely the prize for the winner, as described in the Iliad.

To the left of the younger wrestler presides the agonothetes, the referee, who watches over the match. Written above the man is the word teverath leading scholars to question if this is the man's name, occupation or title. Clad in a cloak with one arm outstretched and in the other he carries a lituus, an augur's crook, he approaches the wrestling match. Two red birds are flying over the wrestling match, a detail that led to the initial misinterpretation of the scene depicting two augurs, are actually the deceased and referee watching the flying birds and the match. Hence the name, Tomb of the Augurs.

On the closest section to the entrance of the right wall is the last motif, which some may consider quite gruesome. It is here the funerary game of bloodletting, a game performed to appease the soul of the deceased, is shown. A masked figure wearing a pointy hat, a long, black false beard, a black/blue jacket with white tassels, and a red loincloth is shown with the word phersu written above. The Etruscan word phersu, meaning "mask," "masked man," or even possibly "actor," since in Greek and Roman plays the actors always wore masks to show what sort of characters were being impersonated. Scholars debate that the phersu painted in this scene is an actor costumed to impersonate an executioner. It is said that when the Romans adopted the Etruscan custom of using slaves and criminals as gladiators, first in funeral games, and finally in exhibitions in vast arenas for the general public, once a gladiator fell mortally wounded and lay still in the arena, out came one masked and costumed man to deal him a "mercy blow" with a hammer to his forehead. But it wasn't a phersu that this fellow impersonated, it was Charun, the Etruscan demon who ferried the dead into Hades. From this scholars even say that the masked man is in fact an actor impersonating Charun in the tomb of the Augurs, and not a torturer or executioner.

The phersu is holding a rope that is attached to the collar of a black dog. When the phersu pulls on the rope, as depicted in the fresco, a nail on the dog's collar bites into its neck, enraging the animal and causing it to attack a tethered man. The tethered man has multiple bleeding bites on his legs, a sack tied over his head and a club in one hand to fend off the dog giving the bloodletting an exciting aspect for the Etruscan spectators to watch. Many scholars believe that this tethered man is a condemned criminal already sentenced to die that is being used for the funerary games. (Although this animal has customarily been described as a "dog," the length of its tail, the proportions of its head and the fact that it is using its exposed claws to lacerate its adversary's legs would seem to make it far more likely that the "black dog" is actually a black leopard.)

=== Left Wall ===
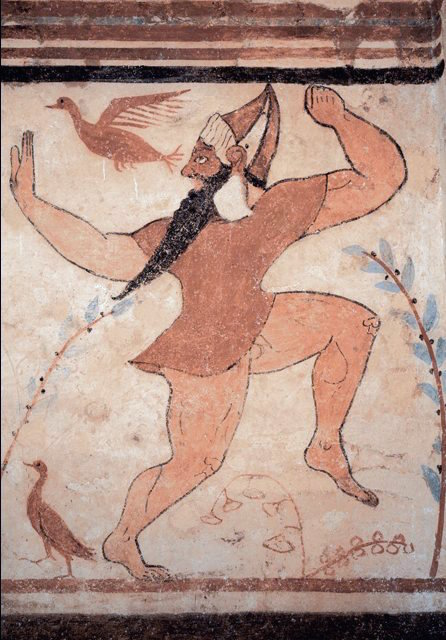
Phersu (left wall) running or dancing, Tomb of the Augurs, late 6th century BC, Tarquinia

On the right side of the left wall, another phersu can be seen, the actions of which are heavily debated. Some interpret the phersu, who is wearing only a red tunic and no loincloth, as dancing solo surrounded by nature, accompanied by birds (originally presumed for augury) and natural botanical motifs. Yet other scholars disagree with this interpretation, Instead taking note of the remnants of two figures to the far left of the wall. One figure can be interpreted as an auleta, a musician playing the aulos. The other, scholars note, only shows the figure's legs. The lost figure's legs are the same hue as the other athletes and are in the same position as the phersu’s at the other end of the wall. Scholars interpret this scene as the phersu being pursued by an opponent in some sort of funerary game, whereas others have interpreted it as a boxing match, but most commonly, it is thought that they are seemingly two separate scenes altogether, and that the phersu is simply dancing.

== See also ==
- Etruscan architecture
- Etruscan art
- Tomb of the Bulls
- Tomb of the Dancers
- Tomb of the Diver
- Tomb of the Leopards
- Tomb of the Triclinium
- Tomb of the Whipping
