= Tomb of the Whipping =

Etruscan tomb in Italy known for its erotic frescoes

Coordinates: 42°14′57.5″N 11°46′12.8″E

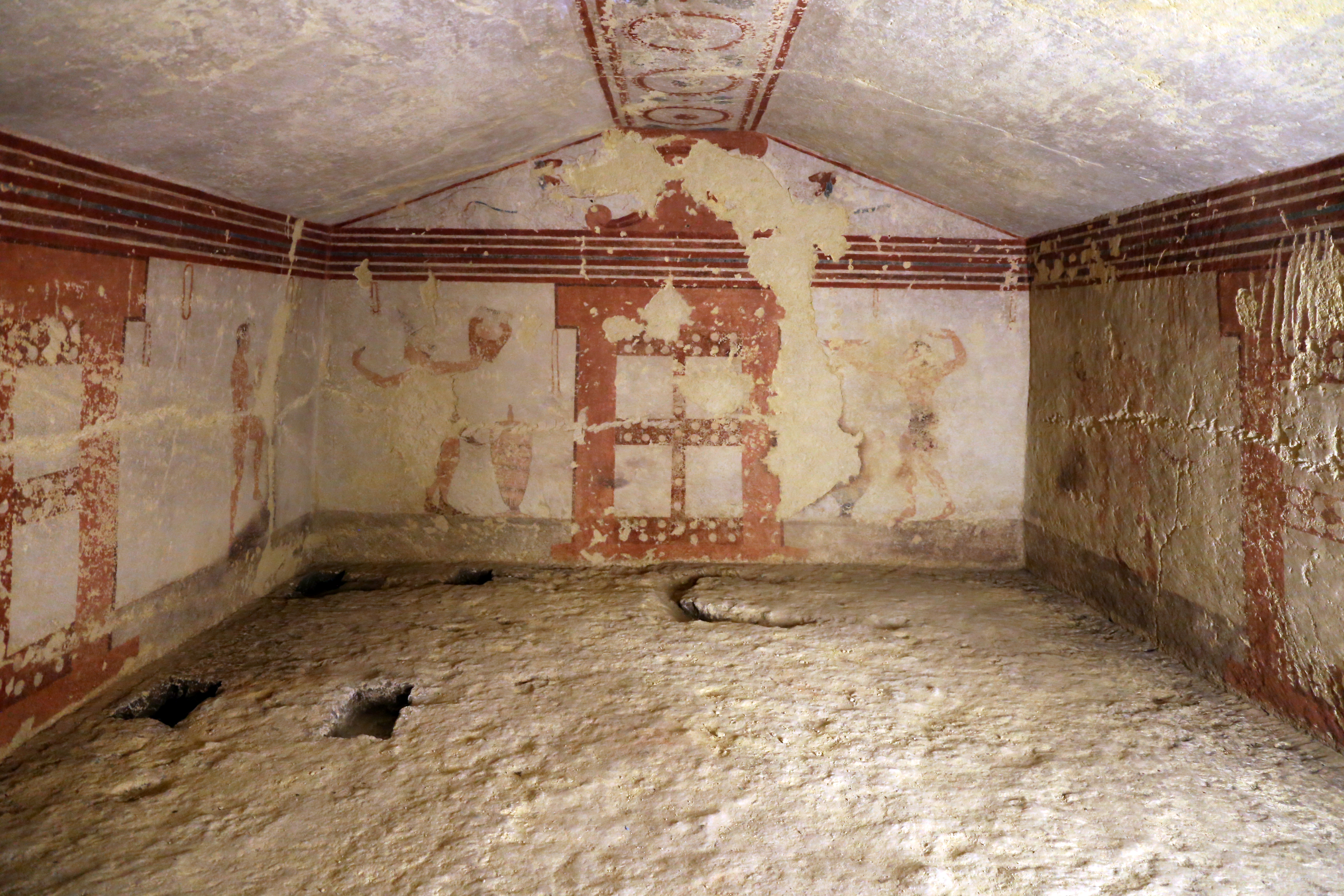
Tomb of the Whipping

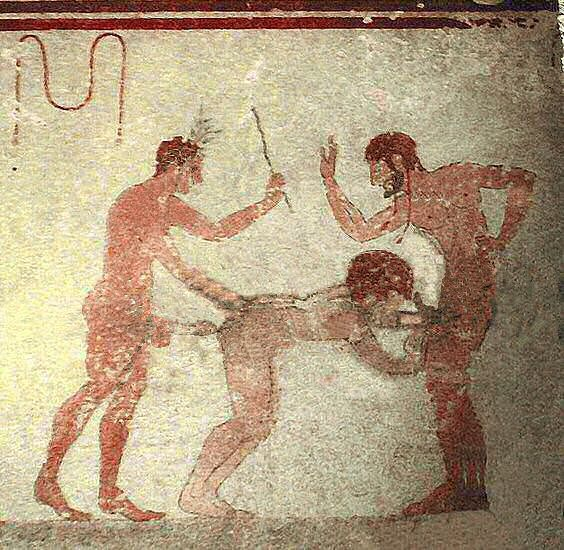
Fresco inside the tomb showing two men flagellating a woman with a whip and a hand during an erotic situation.

The Tomb of the Whipping (Italian: Tomba della Fustigazione) is an Etruscan tomb in the Necropolis of Monterozzi near Tarquinia, Lazio, Italy. It is dated to approximately 490 BC and named after a fresco of two men who flog a woman in an erotic context. The tomb was discovered and excavated in 1960 by Carlo Maurilio Lerici. Most of the paintings are badly damaged.

== Description and interpretation ==
The tomb has one room. Komos participants, musicians, dancers and a nude boxer are painted on the walls. This suggests an influence of the cult of Dionysus. On the wall in the back opposite the entrance two of these figures are separated by a false door, a door painted on the wall.

On the wall to the right of the entrance two erotic scenes are visible. They consist of two men and one woman each, also separated by a false door. The scene on the left shows two men who are likely having sexual intercourse with the woman standing between them. The scene on the right side depicts a woman bending and holding the hips of a bearded man to the right who is beating her with a flat hand. Possibly the woman performs fellatio on the male, but damage makes it impossible to determine for sure. Another beardless man stands behind her to the left, with one hand on her buttocks and a raised whip in the other hand.

The flogging might have had a ritualistic nature. Erotic scenes like these had an apotropaic purpose to keep demons away from the tomb. They were also life-affirming and need to be interpreted in clear contrast to the symbolism of death. Along with the frescoes of the Tomb of the Bulls these paintings are relatively rare examples of explicit sexual scenes in Etruscan art, which were far more common in Ancient Greek art.
