= Tomb of the Triclinium =

Etruscan tomb in the Necropolis of Monterozzi near Tarquinia, Italy

Coordinates: 42°27′48″N 11°47′42″E

- Tomba del Triclinio (Italian)
- Location within Italy
- Type: Etruscan tomb
- Periods: Etruscan civilization
- Cultures: Etruscan culture
- Associated with: Likely elite individuals of Etruscan society
- Location: Necropolis of Monterozzi, Tarquinia, Lazio, Italy
- Region: Southern Etruria
- Part of: Necropolis of Monterozzi

History
- Built: c. 470 BC
- Built by: Unknown (possibly a Greek metic)
- Abandoned: Unknown

Site notes
- Material: Tuff (volcanic rock) (volcanic stone)
- Excavation dates: 1830
- Condition: Deteriorated frescoes; frescoes moved to Tarquinia National Museum in 1949 for conservation
- Owner: Public
- Management: Tarquinia National Museum
- Public access: Yes

The Tomb of the Triclinium (Italian: Tomba del Triclinio) ) is an Etruscan tomb in the Necropolis of Monterozzi (near Tarquinia, Italy) dated to approximately 470 BC. The tomb is named after the Roman triclinium, a type of formal dining room, which appears in the frescoes of the tomb. It has been described as one of the most famous of all Etruscan tombs.

Since its discovery in 1830, the tomb's frescoes have deteriorated and lost some of their color and detail. In 1949 they were moved to the Tarquinia National Museum to conserve them. Thanks to watercolor copies made by Carlo Ruspi shortly after the tomb's discovery, it is still possible to see the frescoes in their former state. The artistic quality of the frescoes has been described as superior to many other Etruscan tombs, and is thought that the artist who decorated the tomb was a Greek metic.

== Description ==
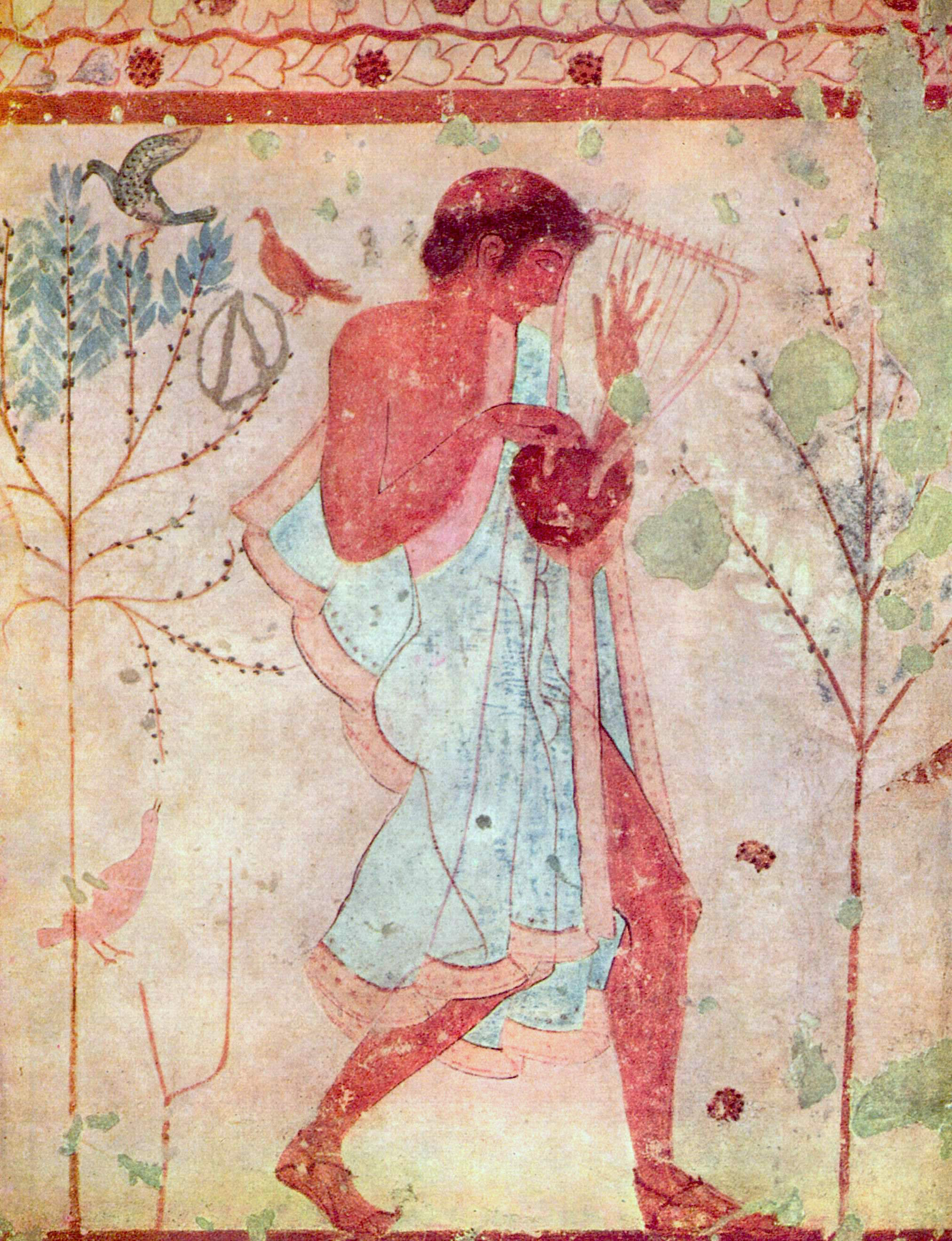
Detail of a barbiton player on the left wall

The tomb consists of a single room. The fresco on the back wall shows a banquet scene, borrowed from depictions of drinking scenes on Attic red-figure pottery from the early fifth century. The banqueteers recline on three couches called klinai. On the floor under the klinai a cat prowls towards a rooster and a partridge. On the left wall three female dancers, one male dancer and a male musician with a barbiton appear. They are placed between small trees filled with birds. On the right wall a similar scene is shown. On the entry wall two youths jump down from their horses. They may be apobates or a reference to the Dioscuri as intermediaries between the earthly life and the afterlife.

The similarities between the frescoes in the Tomb of the Triclinium and Tomb 5513 (also in the Necropolis of Monterozzi) led Steingraber to conclude that they were the products of the same workshop. The strong influence of red-figure Attic vase painting has convinced some experts that the artist who decorated the tomb was a Greek metic.

== Gallery ==
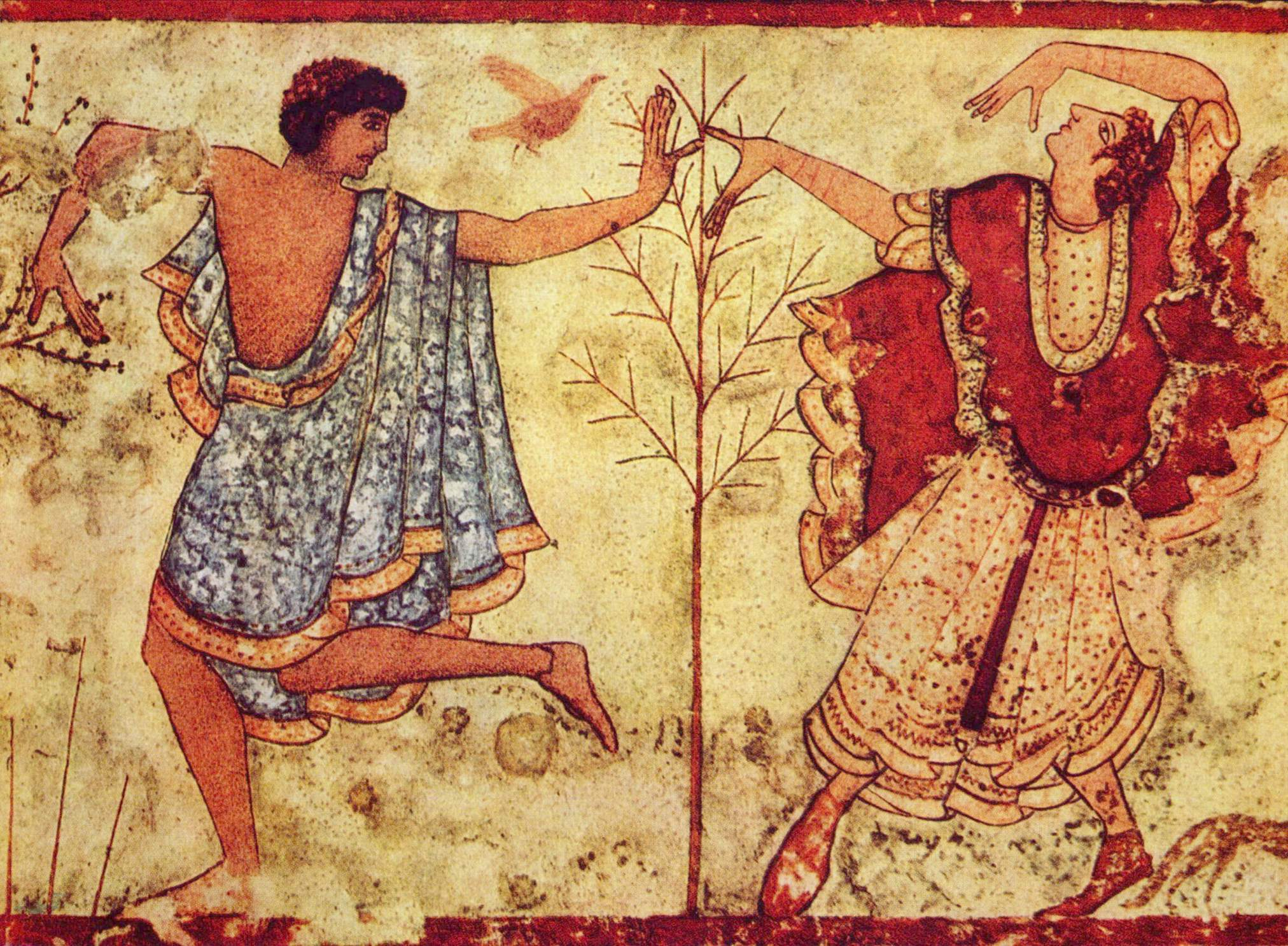
Detail of two dancers on the right wall

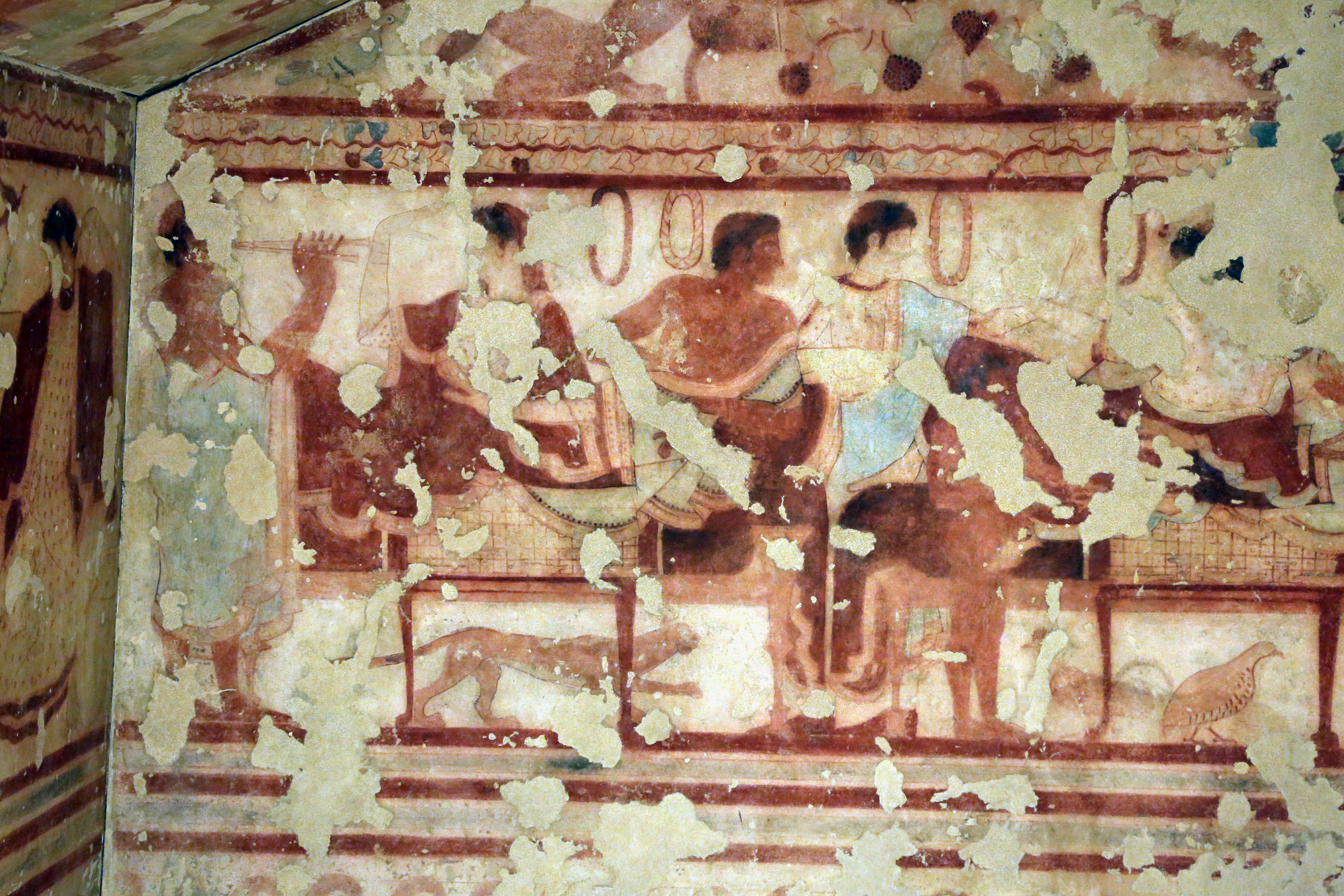
Detail of Tomb of the Triclinium

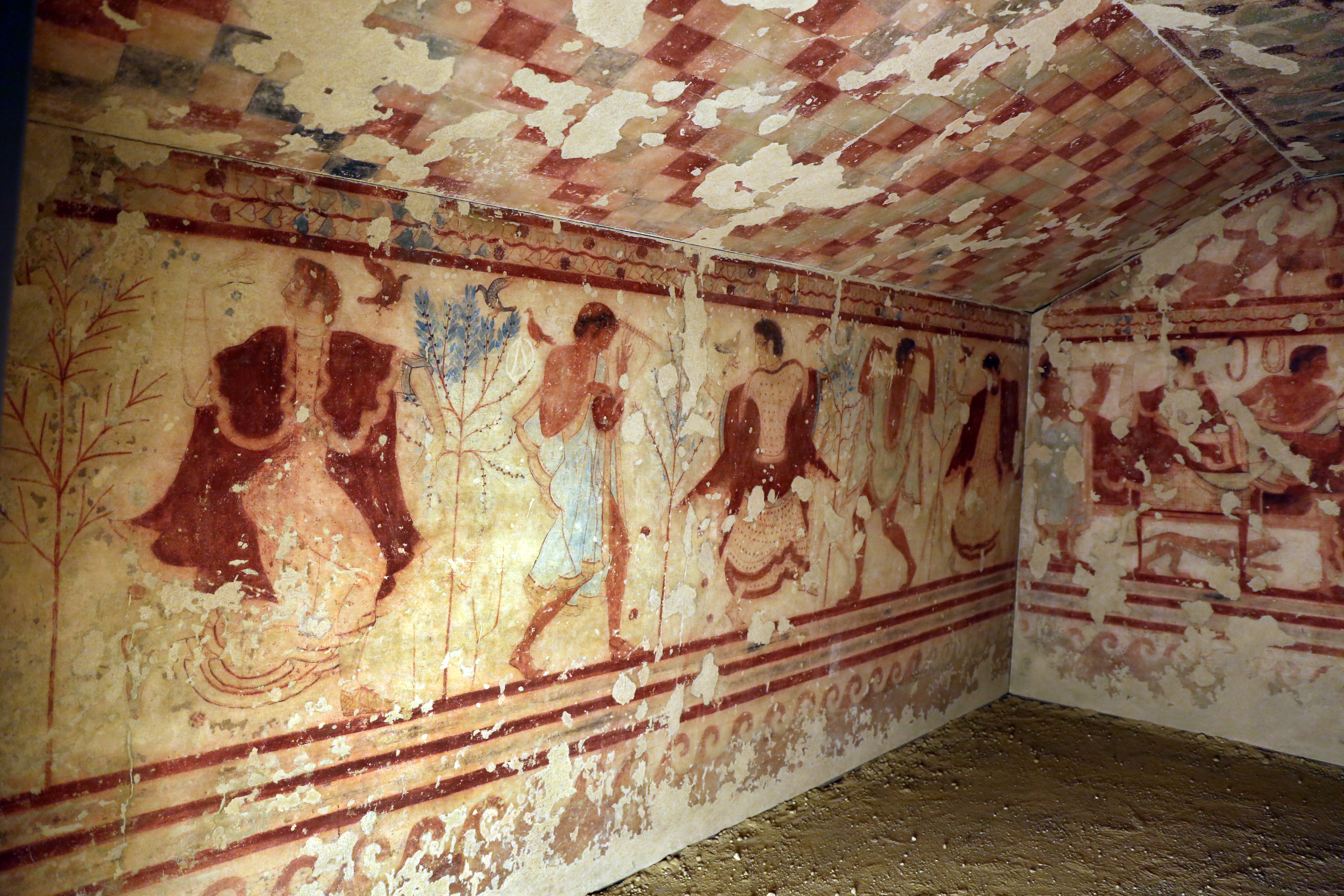
Detail of dancers and musicians

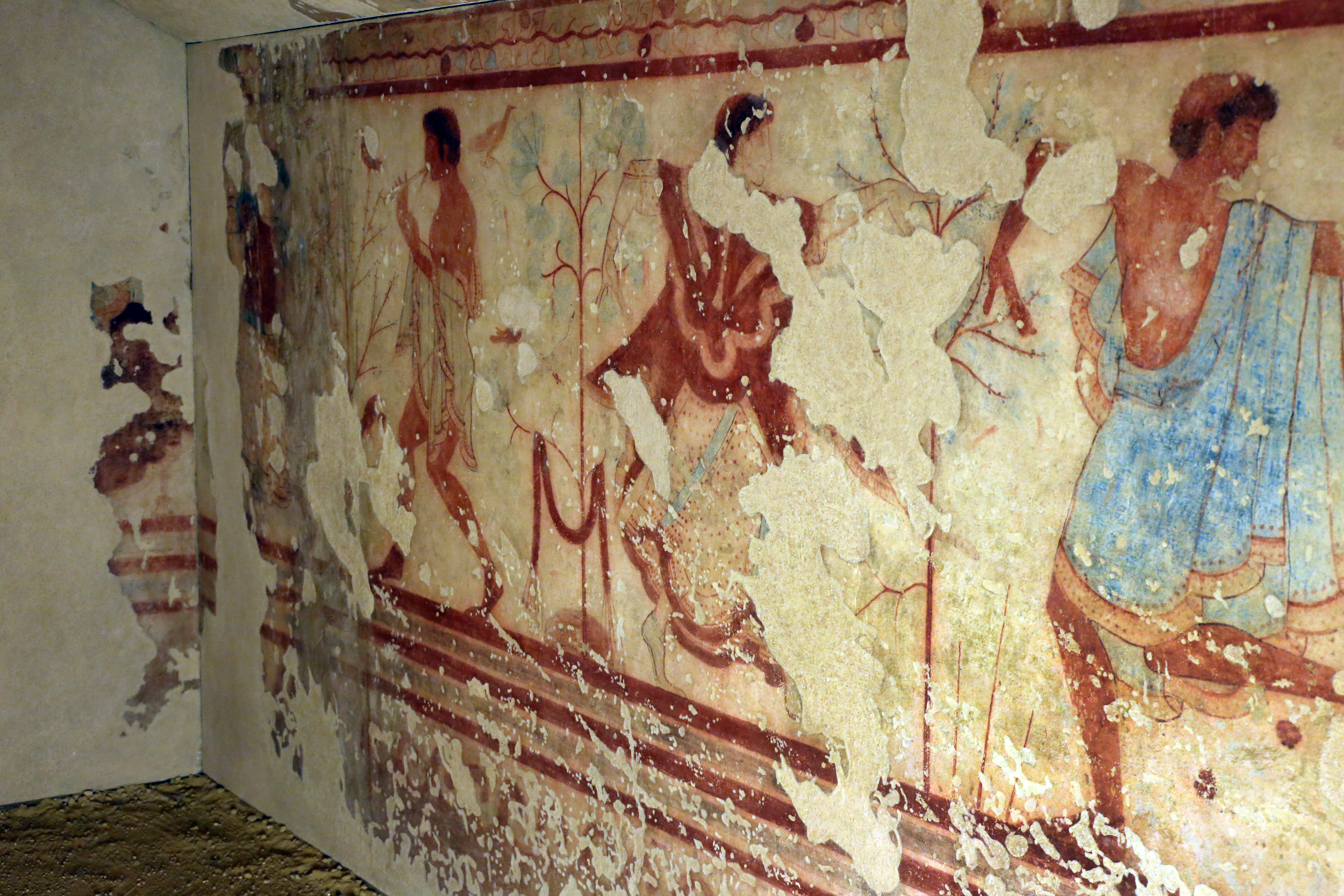
Detail of the entertainers from banquet scene

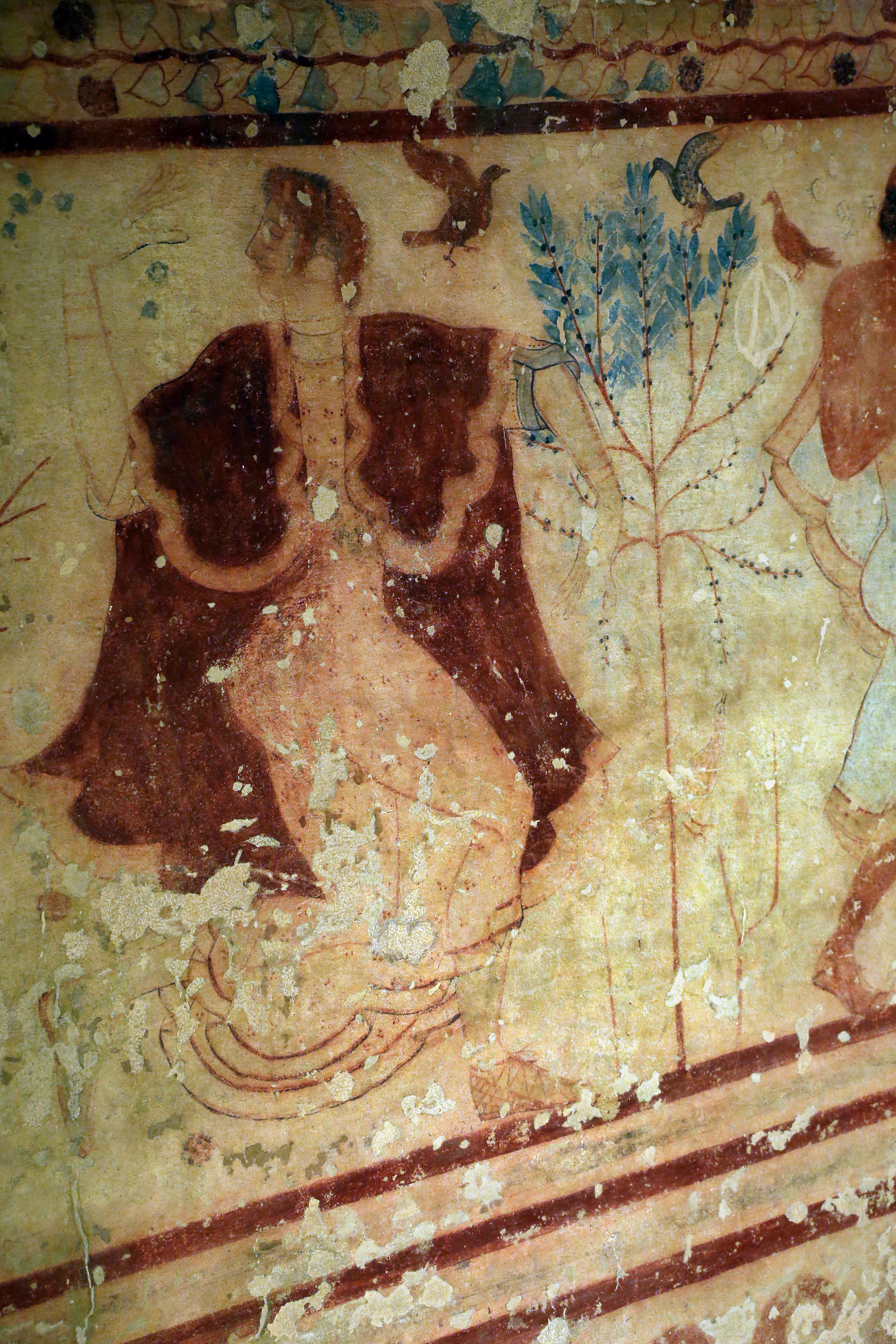
Detail of a dancer

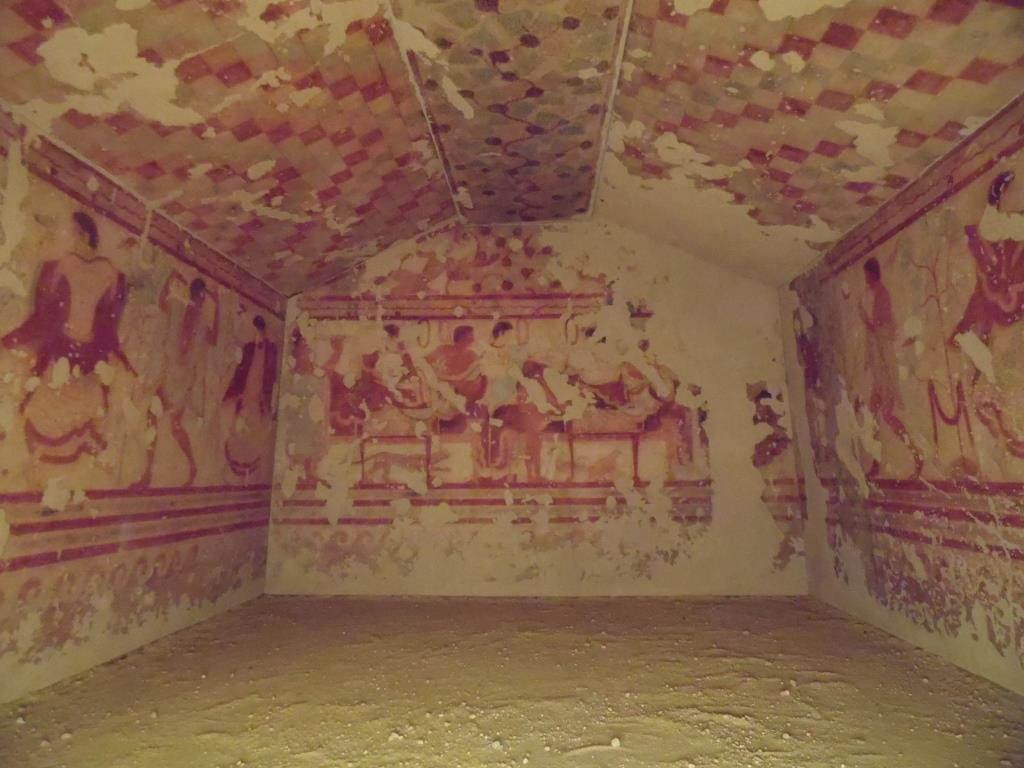
Detail of fresco depicting banquet.

== See also ==
- Etruscan art
- Tomb of the Augurs
- Tomb of the Bulls
- Tomb of the Dancers
- Tomb of the Diver
- Tomb of the Leopards
