= Tomb of the Dancers =

Peucetian tomb in Ruvo di Puglia, Italy

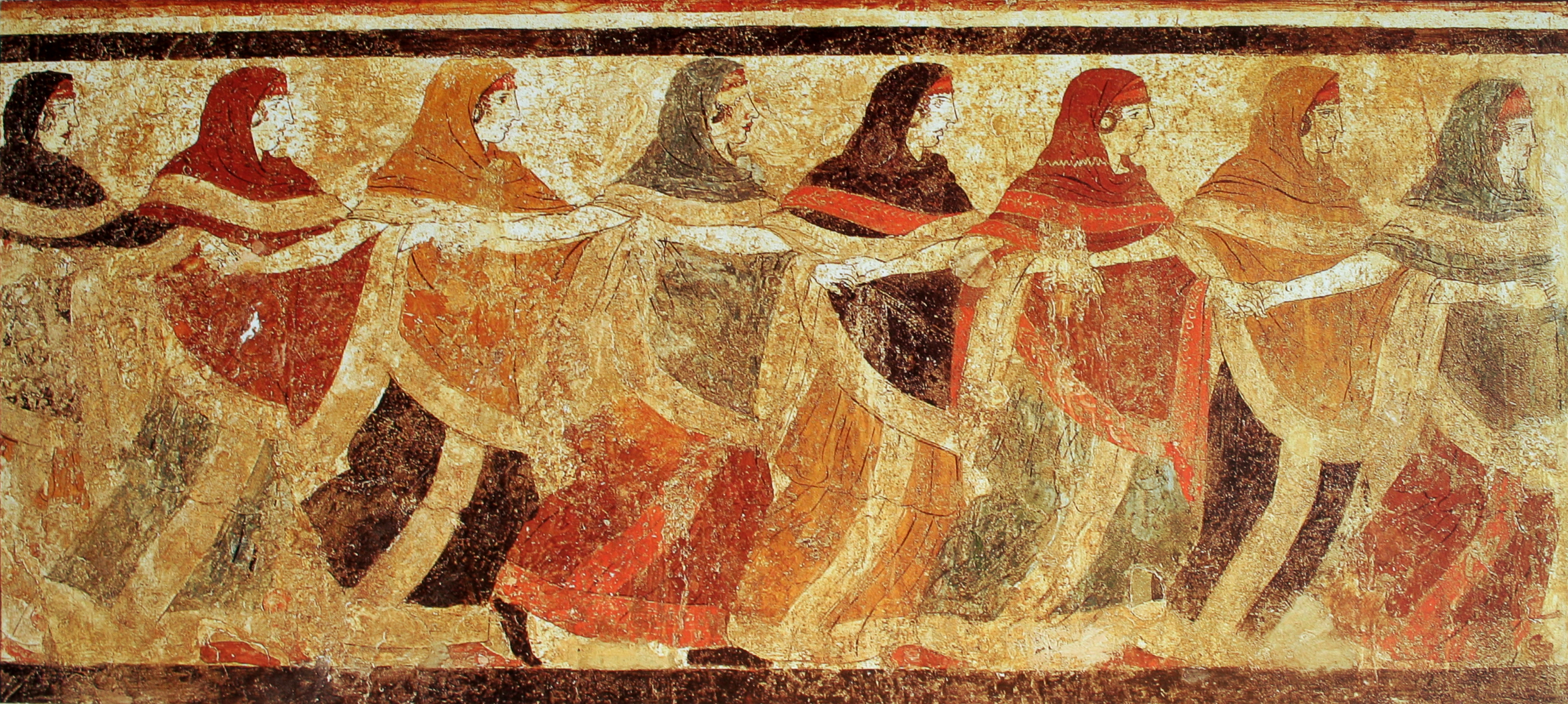
Fresco from the tomb depicting dancing Peucetian women

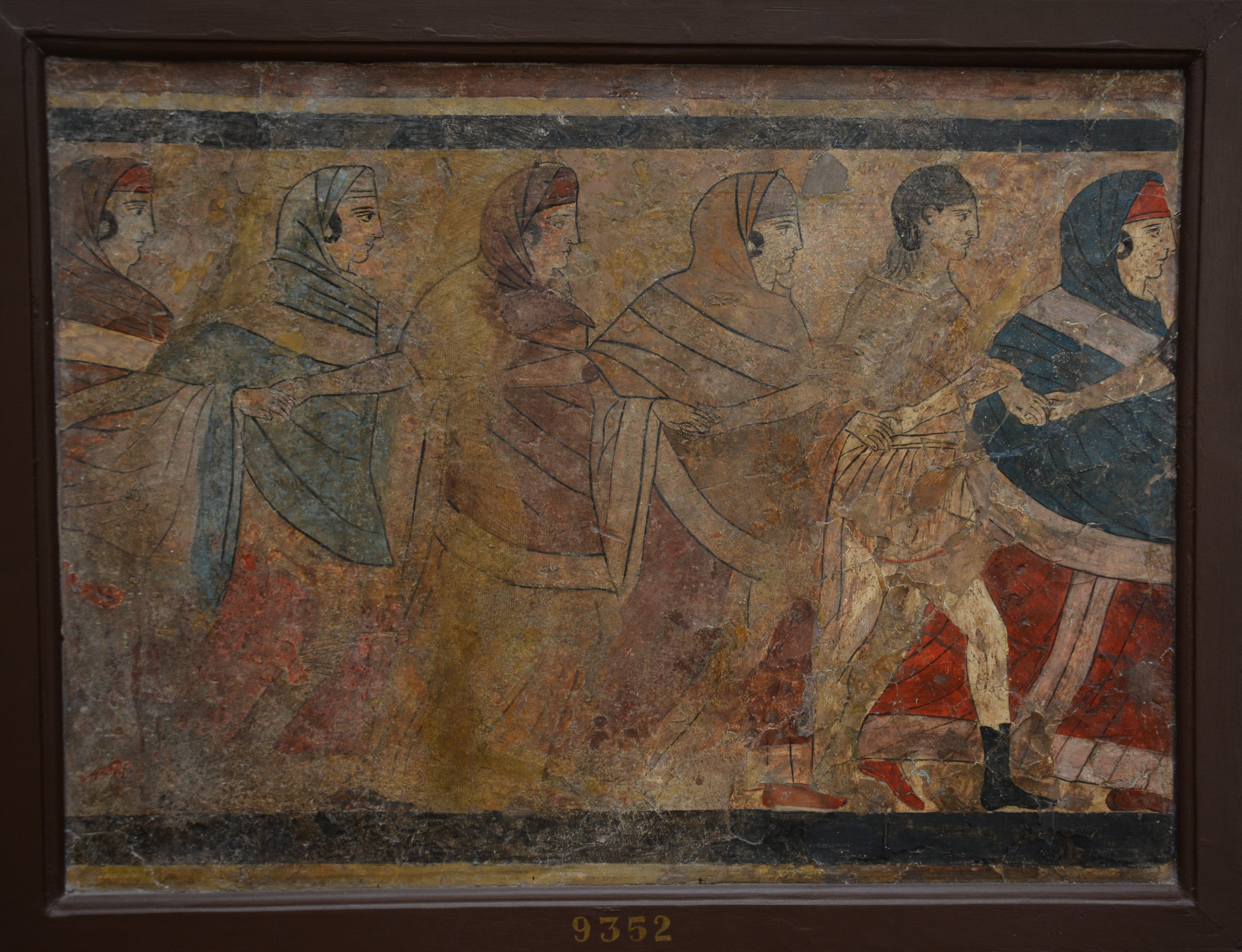
Image of the fresco showing not just the women dancing but also a man dressed in all white carrying an instrument.

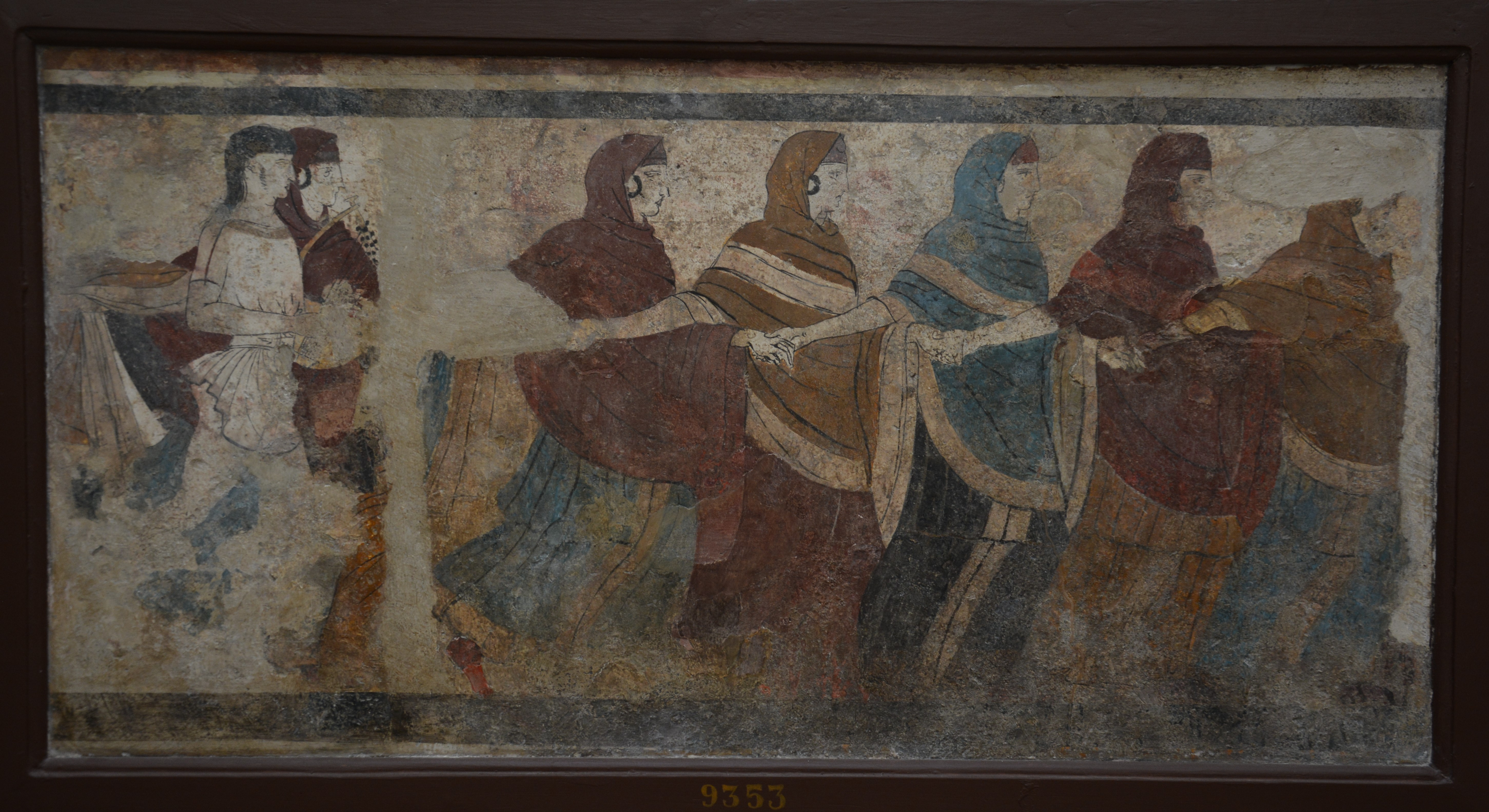
Image showing a second male figure with different musical instrument dressed in white.

The Tomb of the Dancers or Tomb of the Dancing Women (Italian: Tomba delle danzatrici) is a Peucetian tomb in Ruvo di Puglia, Italy. It was discovered in the Corso Cotugno necropolis in November 1833. The date of its construction is uncertain, dates ranging from the end of the fifth century BC to the mid-fourth century BC have been proposed. In any case, the tomb's frescoes are the oldest example of figurative painting in Apulia, together with another tomb in Gravina di Puglia. The Peucetians borrowed the practice of painting tombs from the Etruscans, who had an important influence on their culture. The tomb is named after the dancing women which appear on the frescoes in the tomb. The panels with the frescoes are now exhibited in the Naples National Archaeological Museum, inv. 9353 in the "Magna Graecia Collection".

== Description ==
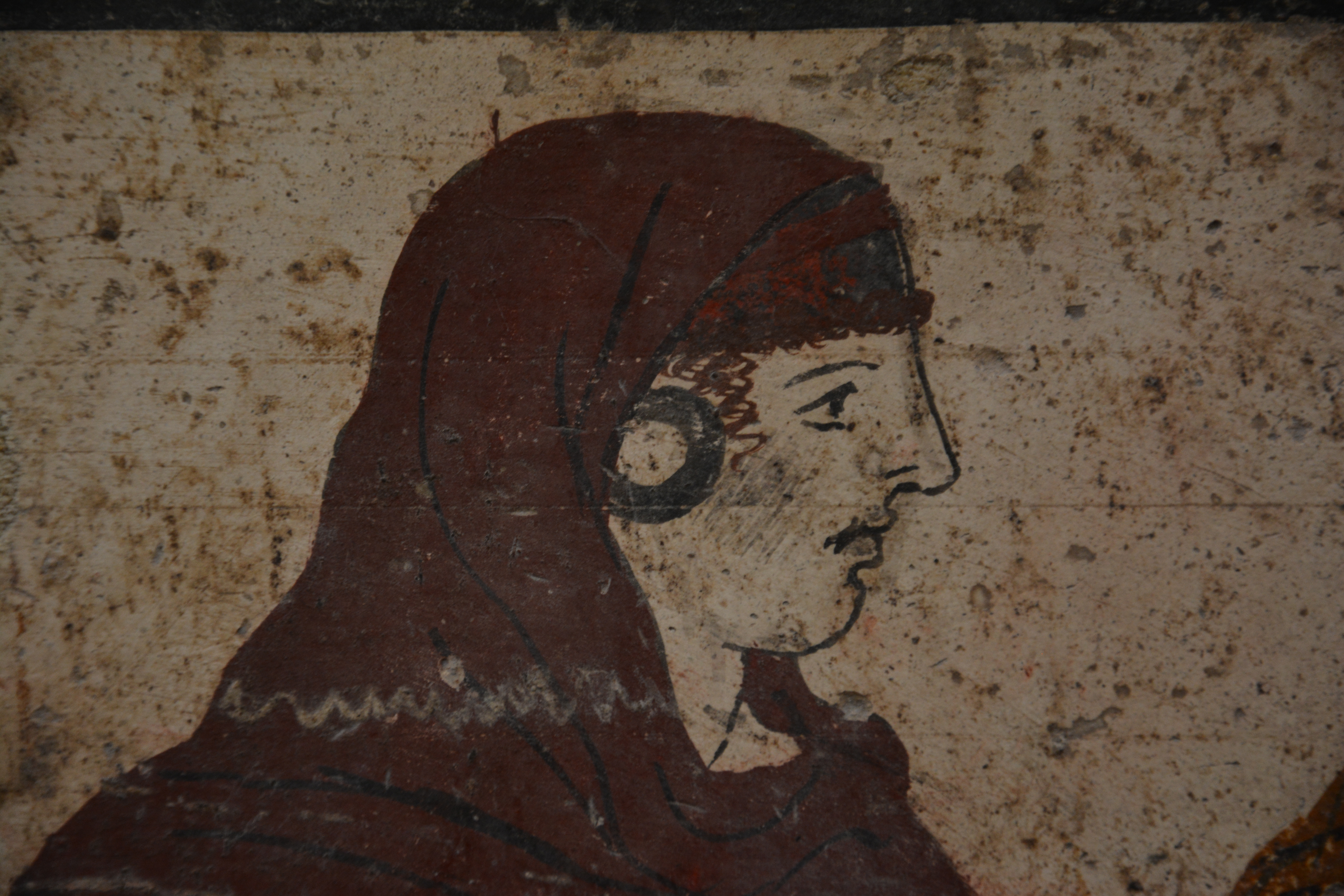
Closeup of one of the dancing women. Showing her solemn look, curly hair, large earring, and what might be a detailed head scarf on her forehead.

The tomb has a semi chamber design. Its six painted panels depict thirty or more dancing women, moving from left to right with arms interlocked as though they were dancing a circle around the interior of the tomb. They are dressed in chitons and cloaks and have brightly colored veils on their head. There are three men in the group, distinguished by their white clothes. One of them holds a lyre.

A major focus of the tomb paintings is seen in the frescos at the Tomb of the Dancers is a celebration that leads up to the burial and ritual of the burial itself. The images suggest that the remembrance of the location of the burial was not important, like it would be today where loved ones are buried with elaborate shrined or gravestones. Its likely that the commemoration of the past did contribute to their funerals, but the absence of grave markers and the possibility of reuse of the graves show that funeral rites might not have been practiced from the fifth and fourth centuries BC. M. Carrol has argued that: "Tombs in Peucetia resembled more the stage for a performance then the final resting place of an individual." As the tomb, the paintings, items surrounding the deceased were placed in a careful a way of display even though it would of only been for a moment.

The skeletal remains of the deceased in the tomb clearly belonged to a distinguished male warrior. He was dressed in a helmet, greaves and shield. Next to his right arm were spears and daggers. The grave goods included different types of ceramic pottery. These consisted of kraters, amphorae, kantharoi and some oil lamps. They were arranged on the ground and hung from the lower sections of the walls. The pottery had symbolic and funerary significance. Drinking sets have occasionally been thought of has a representation of the Greek symposium, although the Peucetian artifacts also show evidence of cooking and eating and are also found at the graves of the women and children as well.

- Etruscan architecture
- Etruscan art
- Italic peoples
- Tomb of the Augurs
- Tomb of the Bulls
- Tomb of the Diver
- Tomb of the Leopards
- Tomb of the Triclinium
- Ruvo di Puglia
- Peucetians
- Gravina in Puglia
- Peucetian pottery
- List of ancient Illyrian peoples and tribes
- National Archaeological Museum, Naples

== Sources ==
- Pascale, Enrico (2009). Death and Resurrection in Art. Los Angeles, California: Getty Publications. ISBN 978-0-89236-947-8.
- De Juliis, Ettore M. (2004). "The Etruscans in Apulia". In Bernardini, Paolo; Camporeale, Giovannangelo (eds.). The Etruscans Outside Etruria. Los Angeles, California: Getty Publications. ISBN 978-0-89236-767-2.
