= Tomb of the Bulls =

Etruscan archaic tomb in Tarquinia

Coordinates: 42°14′24″N 11°47′40″E

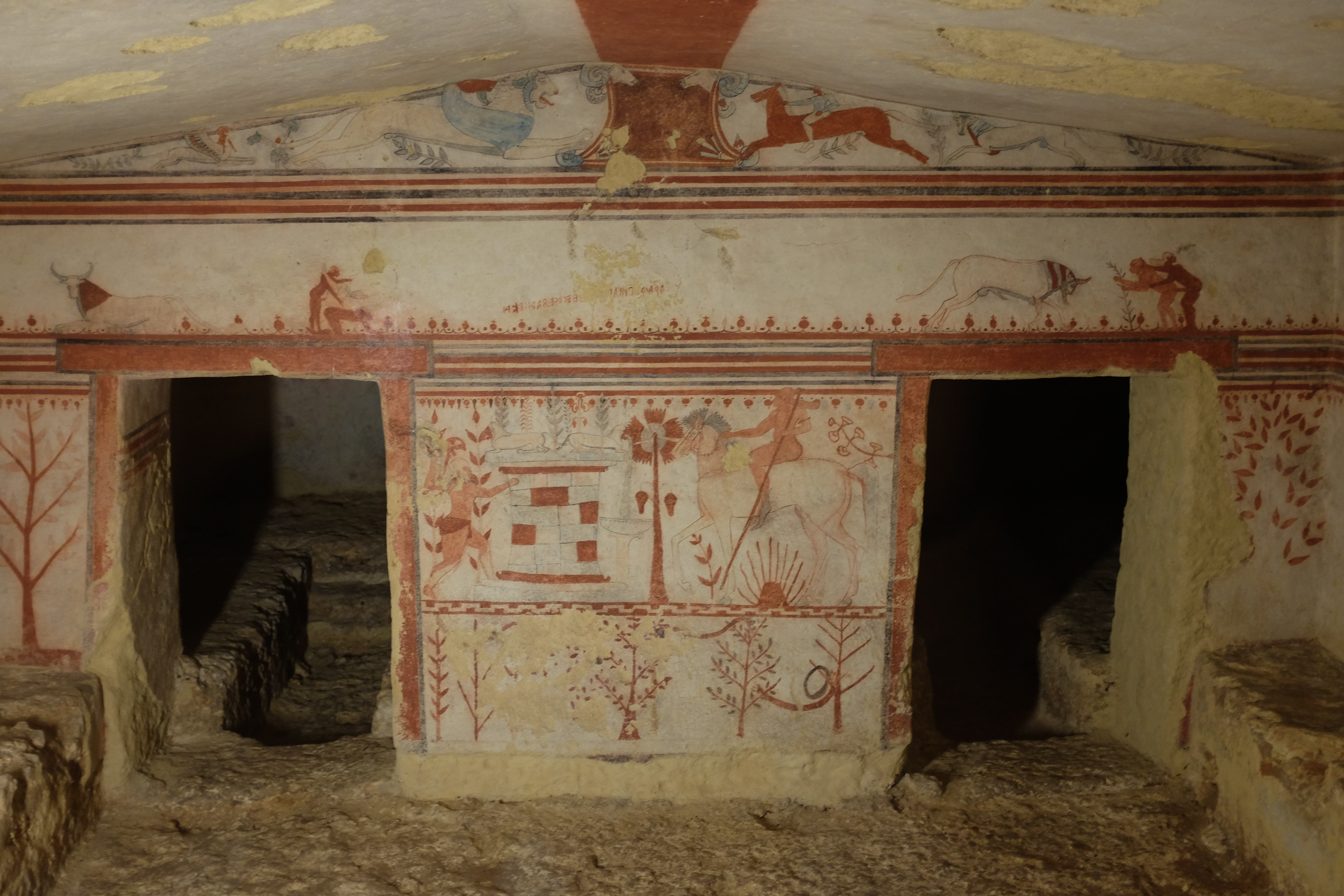
The back wall of the tomb's main chamber as seen from the entrance

The Tomb of the Bulls (Italian: Tomba dei tori) is an Etruscan tomb in the Necropolis of Monterozzi near Tarquinia, Lazio, Italy. It was discovered in 1892 and has been dated back to either 540–530 BC or 530–520 BC. According to an inscription Arath Spuriana apparently commissioned the construction of the tomb. It is named after the two bulls which appear on one of its frescoes. It is the earliest example of a tomb with complex frescoes in the necropolis, and the stylistic elements are derived from Ionian Greek culture. Along with the frescoes of the Tomb of the Whipping these paintings are relatively rare examples of explicit sexual scenes in Etruscan art, which were far more common in Ancient Greek art.

Like other Etruscan tombs, it would originally have contained many grave goods, especially Etruscan pottery, now removed.

== Description ==
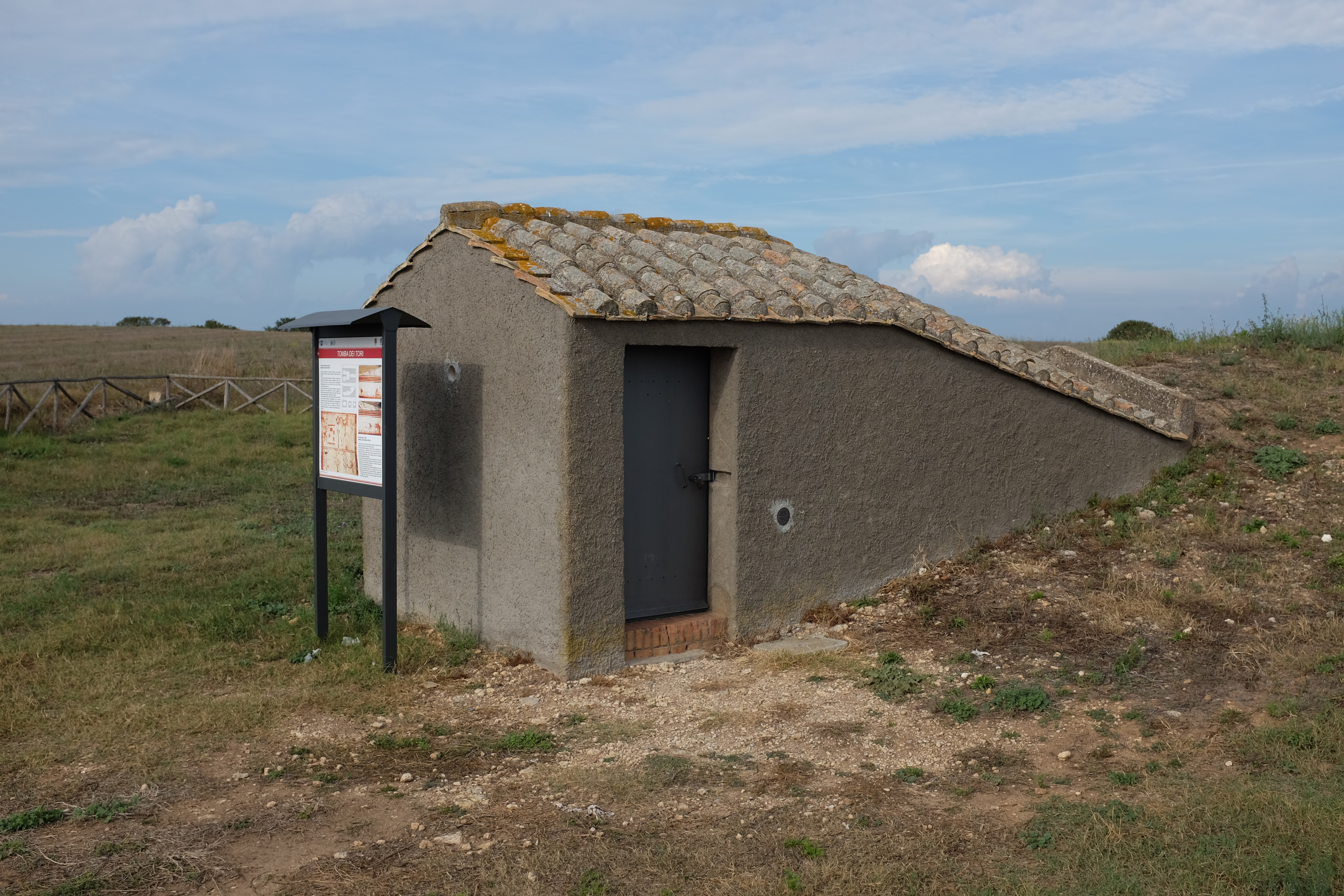
The entrance to the tomb

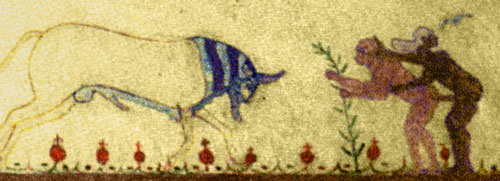
The scene on the right of the erotic fresco

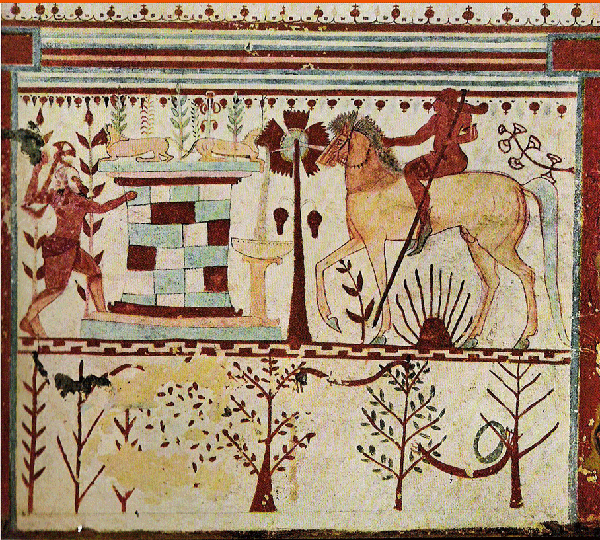
The fresco of the ambush of Troilus

The entrance to the tomb leads to the main chamber. The back wall of the main chamber is opposite to the entrance and contains two doorways that lead to two other chambers. Frescoes with brightly colored animals adorn the gabled areas at the top of the front and back walls of the chambers. These include bulls, birds, hippocampi, a panther, a lion and a goat. The back wall of main chamber is the only wall with frescoes painted below the gable.

The tympanum of this wall is decorated with a fresco of a man on a horse on the right. He is opposed to the Chimaera on the left.

Below the tympanum and above the two doorways is a fresco with two erotic scenes. In the left scene one man rests on his knees and forearms, facing to the right. A woman lies on his back. A man standing behind them to the left has sexual intercourse with the woman. They pay no attention to a calm bull which lies further to the left. In the right scene two men have sexual intercourse, which angers a bearded, man-headed bull with a phallus. The man who is being penetrated sees that the bull is charging at them from the left. He is not in a good position to flee because he is being held by the man penetrating him from behind, who looks the other way. Along with the frescoes of the Tomb of the Whipping these paintings are relatively rare examples of explicit sexual scenes in Etruscan art, which were far more common in Ancient Greek art.

Another fresco is situated horizontally between the two doorways, in the center of the wall. It portrays the ambush of Troilus by Achilles, which is described in the Cypria. On the left, Achilles is shown armed with a sword and spear and wearing a helmet, greaves and a loincloth. He hides behind several plants and a large fountain. Troilus approaches from the right on a horse, unaware of the presence of Achilles. Achilles is naked but armed with a long spear. The event precedes the pursuit and slaying of Troilus by Achilles at the altar of Apollo. Below this ambush scene are nine trees that depict the changing seasons.

== Interpretations of the frescoes ==
Over time the tomb's paintings have been interpreted quite differently by archaeologists. The tomb has also served as an example in the discussion of the degree of Greek influence on Etruscan culture.

=== The Troilus fresco ===
In the first half of the 19th century, art historians thought that the Etruscan artist who created the fresco of the ambush of Troilus primarily copied Greek iconography. John Peter Oleson disagrees and argues that the Etruscan influence should not be underestimated. The careful representation of the event indicates that the artist must have been familiar with the story of the myth rather than only its artistic representations. At the same time, the fresco also has characteristics which make it uniquely Etruscan.

Most obviously, the drawing style of the figures is typical for Etruscan frescoes. The fountain has a unique form and might represent a local Etruscan design. A more subtle characteristic is the vegetation near Achilles, between the front legs of the horse and above the tail of the horse. It is seen on many other archaic Etruscan tomb frescoes, often yielding dark blue berries. It is probably symbolic of rebirth or a Chthonic transformation.

Yet, Oleson regards the dark-red semicircle below the horse of Troilus as the most important symbolism. Ten long, thin rays of the same color spread from its center. Previously seen as a badly drawn or unknown kind of plant by most, Oleson interprets it as the setting sun. It is unique because a setting sun does not appear on any Greek or Etruscan vase paintings dealing with Troilus. He proposes the setting sun is symbolic of the death of Troilus, just like the rising sun is symbolic of rebirth.

The symbolism is mirrored by the trees below the ambush scene. Their variation in size and foliage may signify the cycle of seasons as a parallel to the cycle of life and death. In addition, the sun was associated with Apollo and Helios, who were conflated in Greek and Etruscan art. They were in turn connected with and responsible for the care and supervision of the dead.

R. Ross Holloway similarly notes the Etruscan influence on the portrayal of Greek mythology. However, he proposes that the scene emphasizes the death of Troilus as a sacrifice. This image would have served to honor and placate the dead in perpetuity. He points out that the sword of Achilles is a single-edged sacrificial knife rather than a double-edged sword. Scenes of slaughter are not uncommon in Etruscan funerary art. A fresco of the sacrifice of the Trojan youths by Achilles at the pyre of Patroclus in the François Tomb is an example of this.

Holloway disagrees with the Oleson's interpretation of the red object below the horse as the setting sun. He thinks it unlikely because a sun god is always portrayed in an anthropomorphic form in Etruscan art.

=== The erotic fresco ===
Oleson connects the two erotic groups with the ambush scene. According to Servius, Achilles was pursuing Troilus out of love instead of an intent to kill him. In these versions Troilus was said to have died as a consequence of a brutal rape or killed for his refusal of Achilles' love. The two bulls might correspond to the sacred bulls of Helios, one vigilant and one angry at the recreation of the sacrilege committed in the sanctuary of Apollo.

Holloway dismisses the connection of the erotic scenes with the ambush scene. Servius lived in 4th and 5th century AD, which makes the use of his work to interpret Etruscan art from the 6th century BC questionable. Instead, Holloway proposes that the erotic groups have an apotropaic purpose to protect from the evil eye. This is consistent with the presence of animals which protect against the evil eye on the frescoes. He identifies the man-headed bull as Achelous, adding that the horns of the bulls and the phallus are weapons against the evil eye.

An entirely different theory is given by Jane Whitehead, who argues that the scene has a humorous meaning. The Etruscans often removed artistic forms from their context for humorous effect. Another option is given by Stefan Steingräber, who thinks the scenes were life-affirming, to be interpreted in clear contrast to the symbolism of death.

=== The Chimaera fresco ===
Oleson sees the rider in the tympanum fresco as Bellerophon. According to Holloway, the Etruscan artist did not copy the Greek iconography of Bellerophon and the Chimaera, but adapted it to an Etruscan setting. He identifies the rider as Troilus because he wears a Phrygian cap and has a large knot of hair. The scene signifies his voyage to the underworld after his sacrificial death.

== See also ==
- Etruscan architecture
- Etruscan art
- Tomb of the Augurs
- Tomb of the Dancers
- Tomb of the Diver
- Tomb of the Leopards
- Tomb of the Triclinium

== Sources ==
- Holloway, R. Ross (1986). "The Bulls in the "Tomb of the Bulls" at Tarquinia". American Journal of Archaeology. 90 (4): 447–452. doi:10.2307/506031. JSTOR 506031. S2CID 191369840.
- Holloway, R. Ross (1965). "Conventions of Etruscan Painting in the Tomb of Hunting and Fishing at Tarquinii". American Journal of Archaeology. 69 (4): 341–347. doi:10.2307/502183. JSTOR 502183. S2CID 191396176.
- Oleson, John Peter (1975). "Greek Myth and Etruscan Imagery in the Tomb of the Bulls at Tarquinia". American Journal of Archaeology. 79 (3): 189–200. doi:10.2307/503479. JSTOR 503479. S2CID 192951578.
- Steingräber, Stephan (2006). Abundance of Life: Etruscan Wall Painting. Los Angeles, California: Getty Publications. ISBN 978-0-89236-865-5.
- Whitehead, Jane (1996). "Towards a Definition of Etruscan Humor". Etruscan Studies. 3 (1): 9–32. doi:10.1515/etst.1996.3.1.9. S2CID 192492303.
