= Tomb of the Leopards =

Etruscan burial complex

- Tomb of the Leopards (Italian)
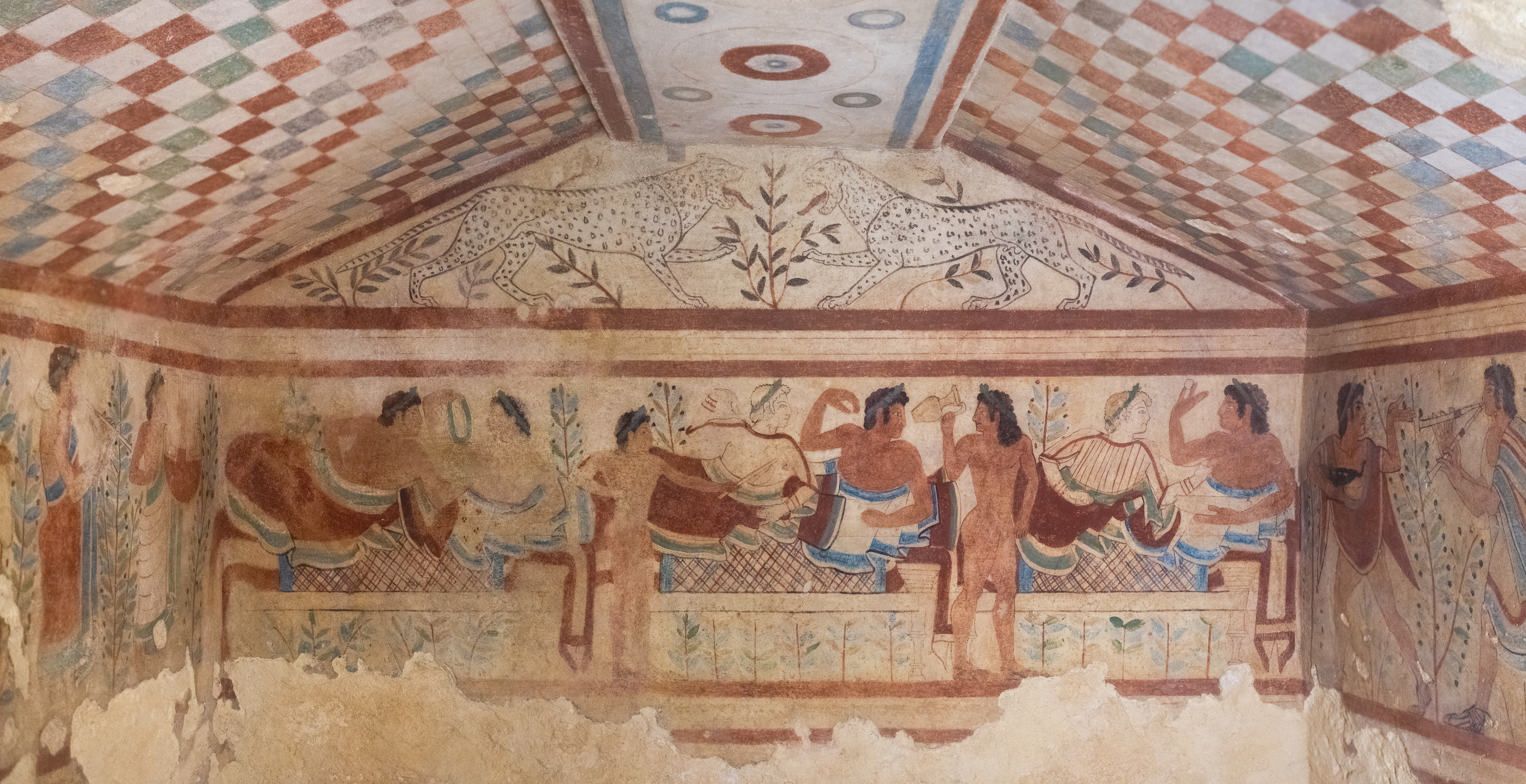
- Confronted leopards above a banqueting scene in the Tomb of the Leopards

- Location within Italy
- 42°15′02″N 11°46′12″E
- Type: Necropolis
- Location: Tarquinia, Lazio, Italy
- Region: Southern Etruria

History
- Built: 5th century BC

Site notes
- Management: Soprintendenza per i Beni Archeologici dell'Etruria Meridionale
- Website: Museum and Necropolis of Tarquinia and Cerveteri

UNESCO World Heritage Site
- Type: Cultural
- Criteria: i, iii, iv
- Reference no.: 1158
- Region: Europe and North America

The Tomb of the Leopards (Italian: Tomba dei leopardi) is an Etruscan burial chamber so called for the confronted leopards painted above a banquet scene. The tomb is located within the Necropolis of Monterozzi, near Tarquinia, Lazio, Italy, and dates to around 470–450 BC. The painting is one of the best-preserved murals of Tarquinia, and is known for "its lively coloring, and its animated depictions rich with gestures." The subject matter is influenced by the Greek-Attic art of the first quarter of the fifth century BC. This Attic influence extends to the very figures of leopards being a main aspect of the fresco.

== Artistic Depiction ==
=== Leopards ===
The Etruscan environment at this time did not include leopards as members of the local ecosystem. Lions and leopards, both commonly referenced in Etruscan artwork as seen in the Tomb of the Lionesses, were likely rarely seen in Etruria. The forms and representations seen are thought to have come from Greek interpretations of hunting leopards popularized in Egypt.

=== Banqueters ===
The banqueters are "elegantly dressed" male-female couples attended by two nude boys carrying serving implements. This scene is known as a conjugal symposium, with both men and women included in the banquet. The women are depicted with fair skin and the men with a darker complexion, in keeping with the gender conventions established in Archaic Greece, Ancient Near East and Ancient Egypt. The arrangement of the three couples prefigures the triclinium of Roman dining. Scholarly controversy surrounded this particular banquet scene with some arguing the women represented were hetaira or courtesans, with other more recent scholars arguing they are equal free women.

=== Musician Scene ===
Musicians are pictured on the walls to the left and right of the banquet. On the right, a komos of wreathed figures and musicians approach the banquet; on the left, six musicians and gift bearers appear in a statelier procession. The musicians carry an aulos and a chelys lyra, both of which are commonly depicted in tandem during Etruscan banquet and funerary scenes. Because of the materiality of these instruments, most being made of bone or wood, the majority of archeological evidence comes through scenes like this one. Along with the musicians, one of the figures is thought to be a eulogizer, singing is consistent with various Etruscan tombs.

=== Symbolism ===
The man on the far-right couch holds up an egg, symbol of regeneration, and other banqueters hold wreaths. The scene is usually taken to represent the deceased's funerary banquet, or a family meal that would be held on the anniversary of his death. It is presented as a celebration of life, while Etruscan banquet scenes in earlier tombs have a more somber character. The scene appears to take place outdoors, within slender trees and vegetation, perhaps under a canopy.

Although the figures are distinctly Etruscan, the artist of the central banquet draws on trends in Greek art and marks a transition from Archaic to Early Classical style in Etruscan art. The processions on the left and right are more markedly Archaic and were executed by different artists.

== Historical Discussion ==
The tomb was discovered in 1875. In the 1920s, D. H. Lawrence described the painting in his travel essays Sketches of Etruscan Places:

The walls of this little tomb are a dance of real delight. The room seems inhabited still by Etruscans of the sixth century before Christ, a vivid, life-accepting people, who must have lived with real fullness. On come the dancers and the music-players, moving in a broad frieze towards the front wall of the tomb, the wall facing us as we enter from the dark stairs, and where the banquet is going on in all its glory. … So that all is color, and we do not seem to be underground at all, but in some gay chamber of the past.

== Gallery ==
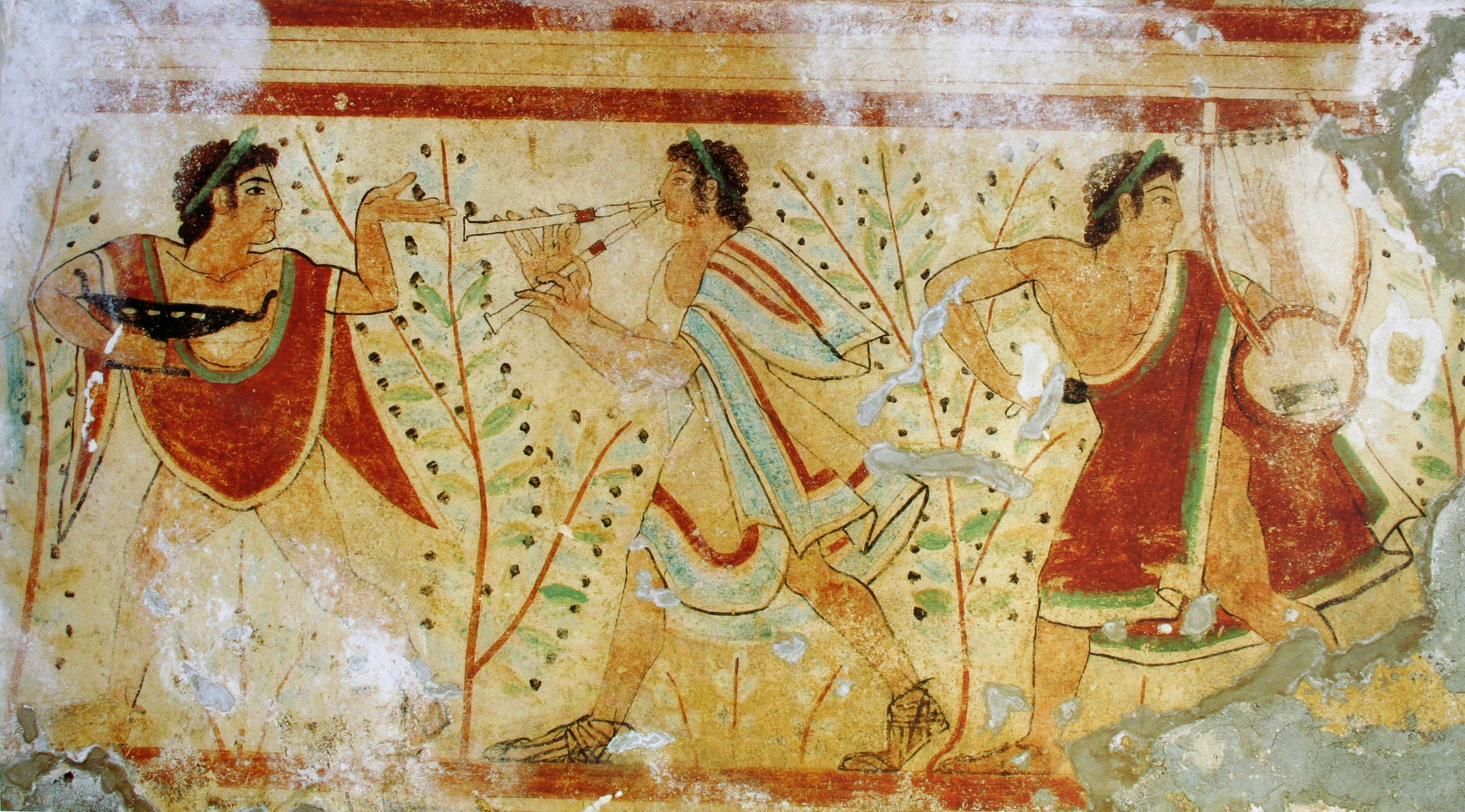
Dancer and musicians

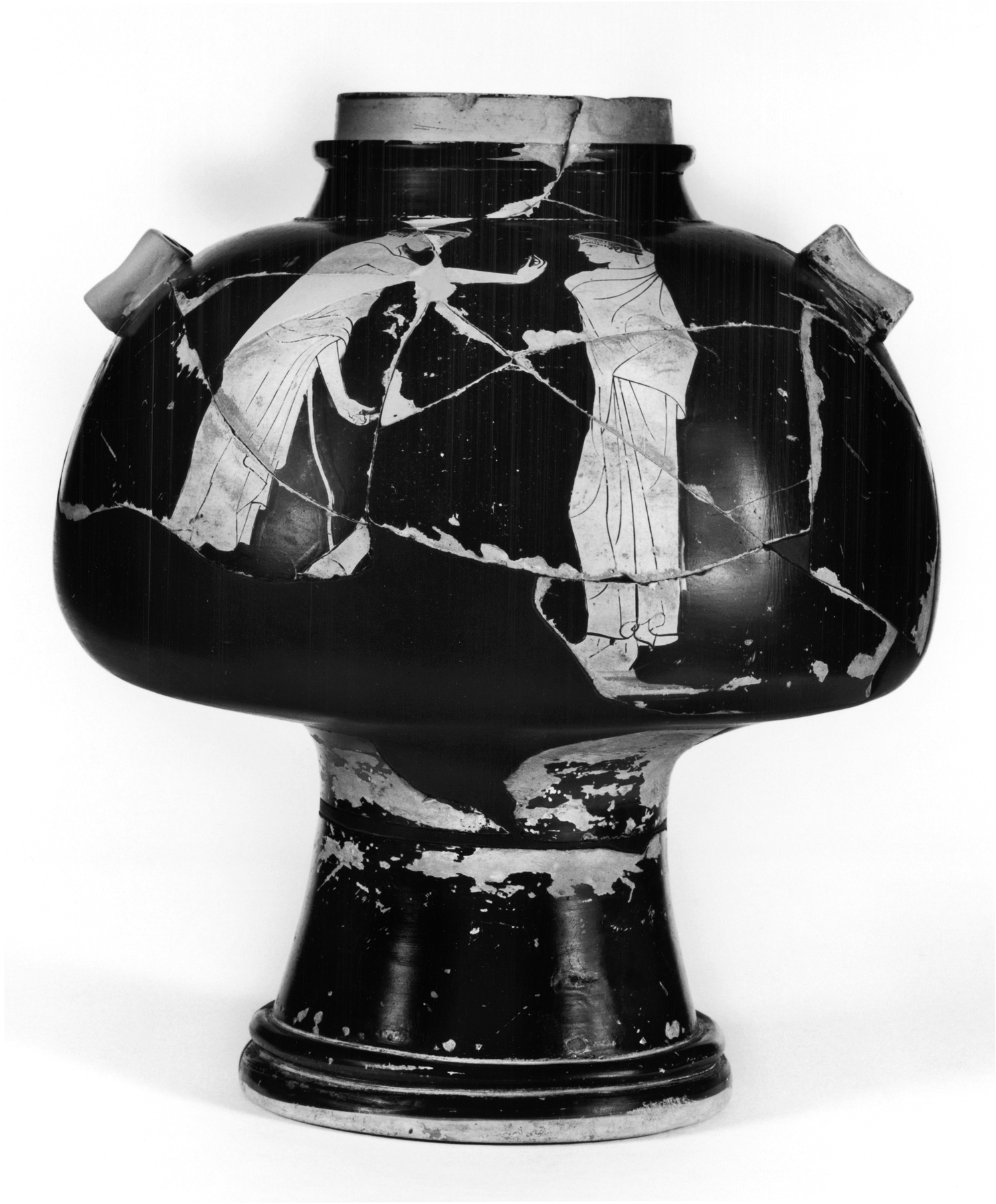
A psykter found in the Tomb of the Leopards, depicting an athlete, a servant boy, a youth and a dog

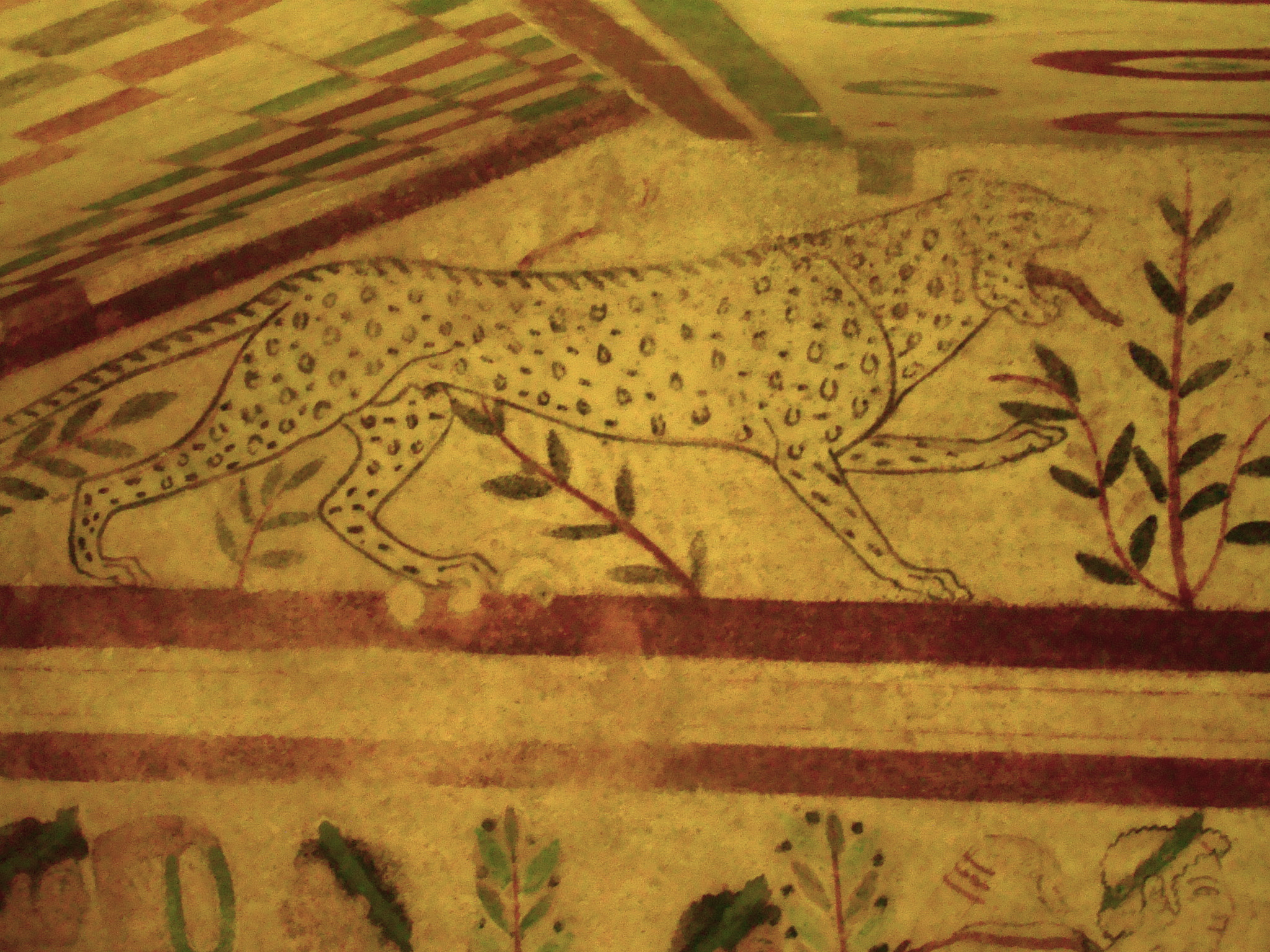
A fresco depicting a spotted Leopard

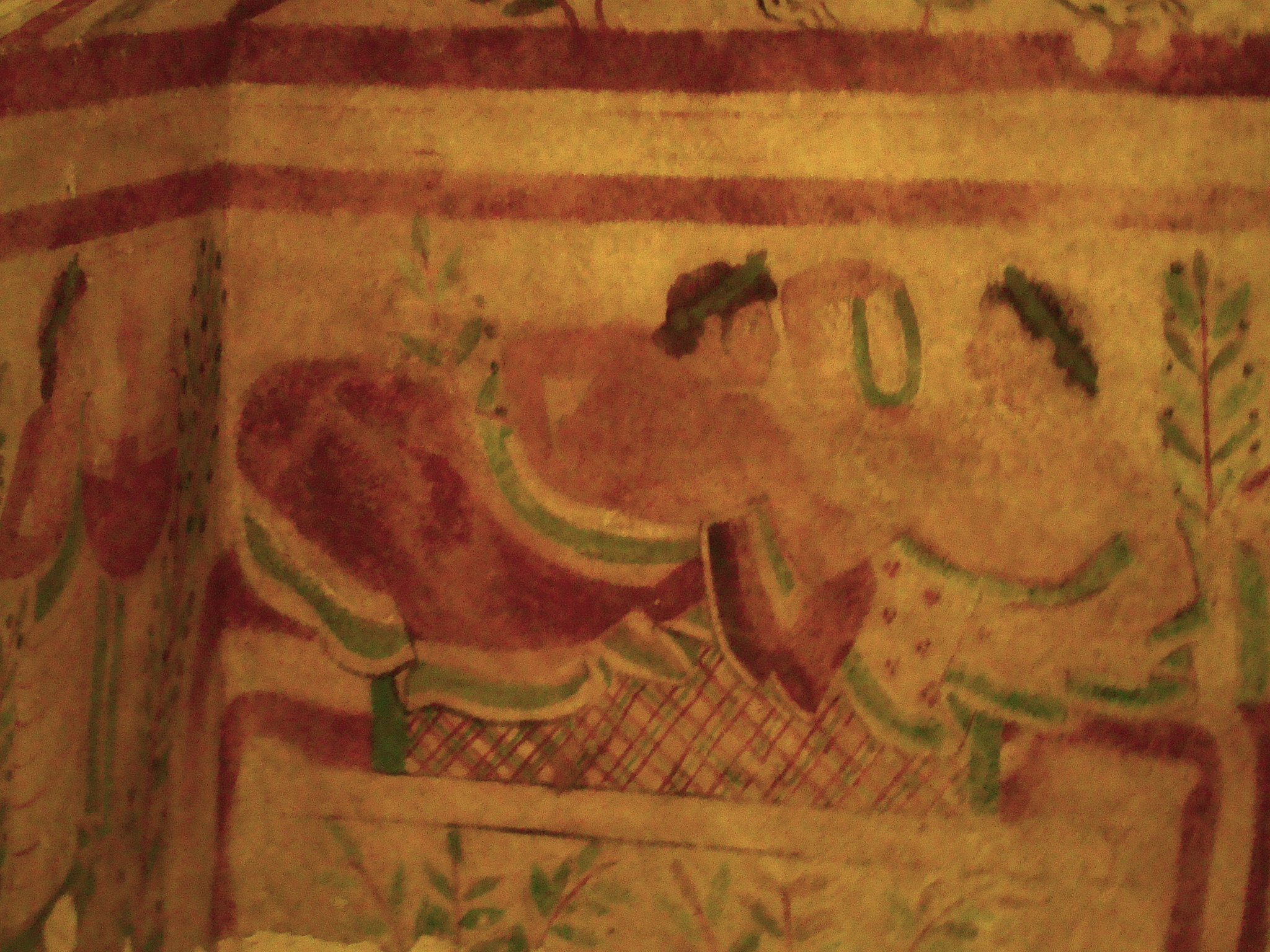
Detail of the banquet scene

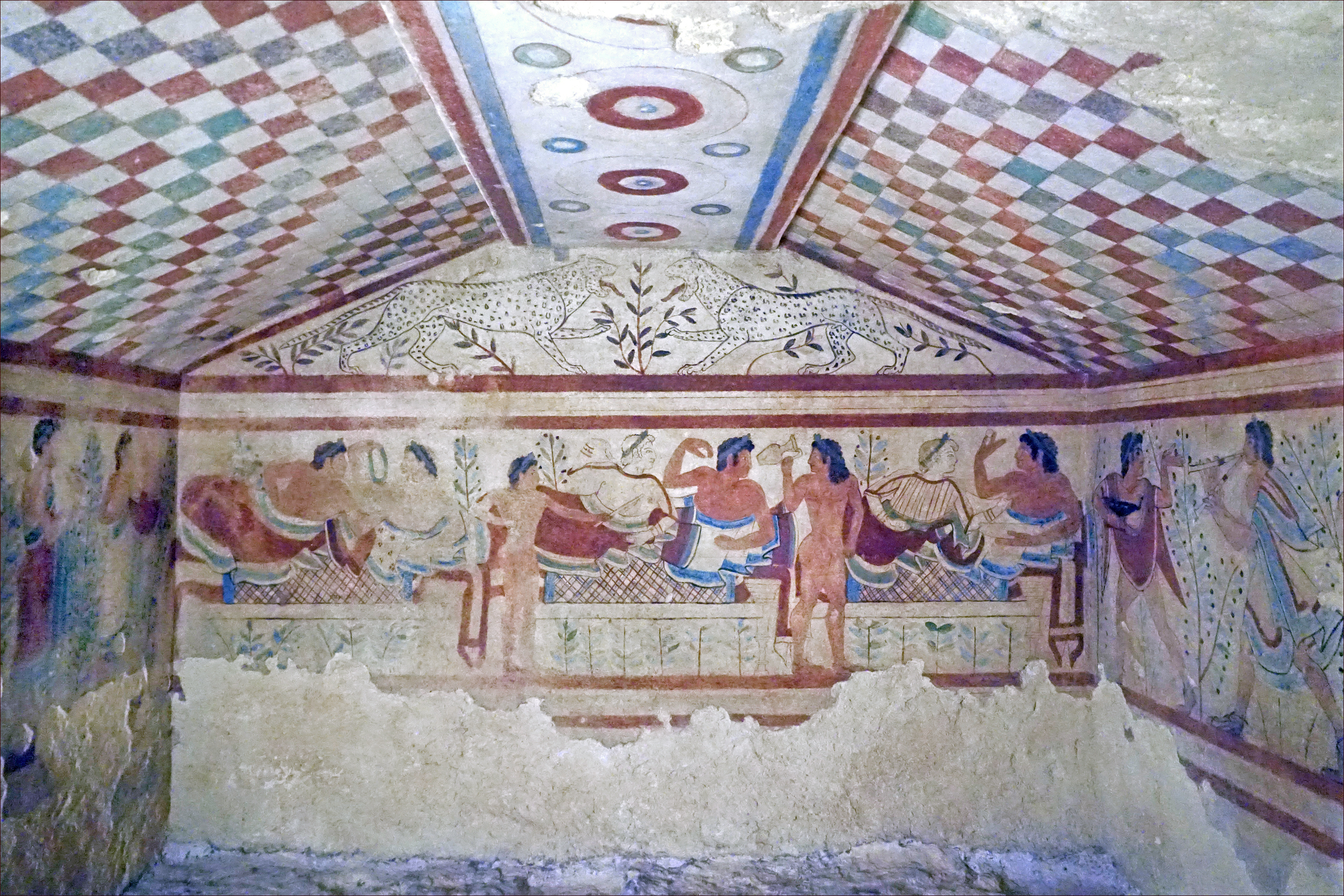
The ceiling is adorned with colorful patterns of red, black, yellow, and blue squares

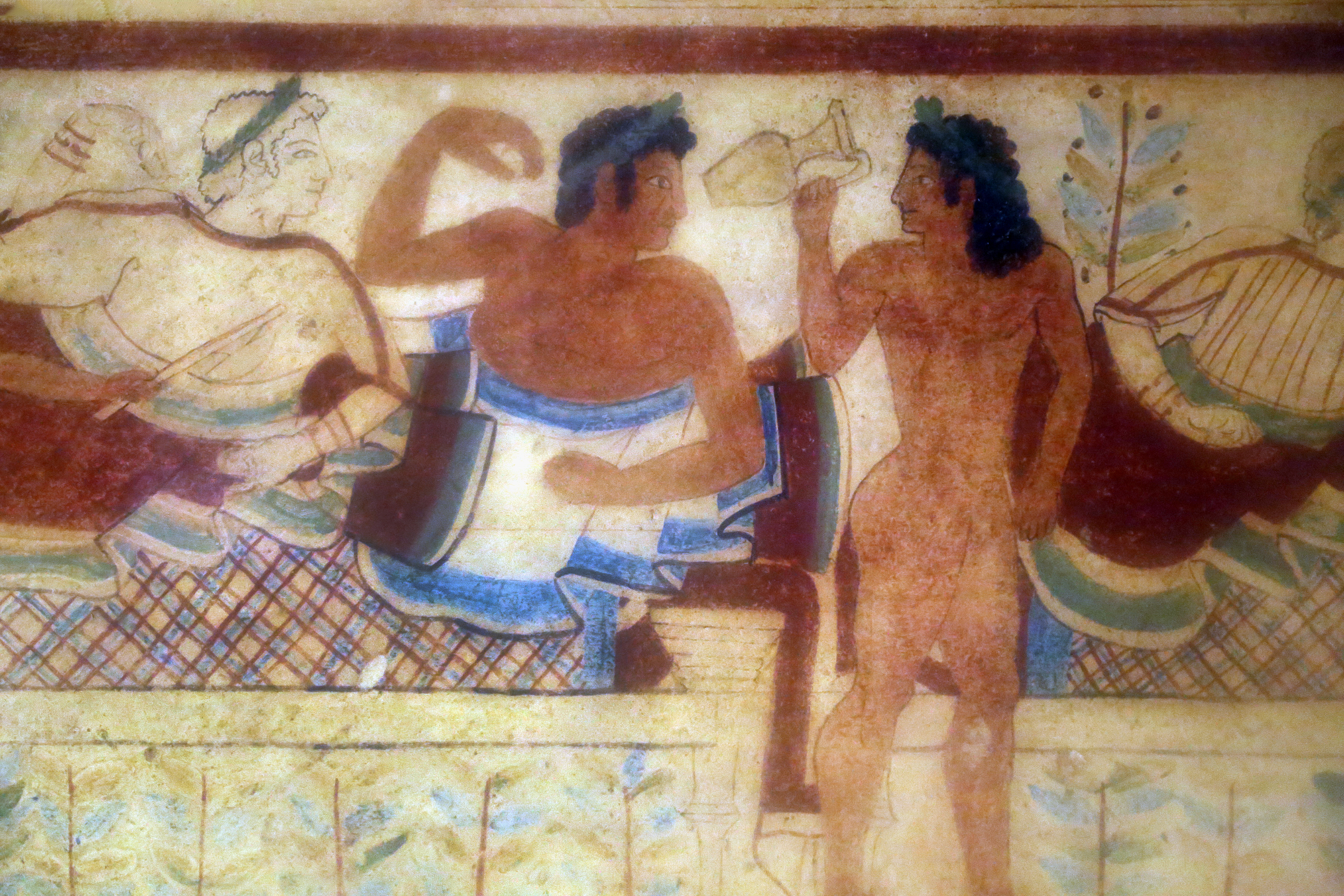
Detail of the banquet scene

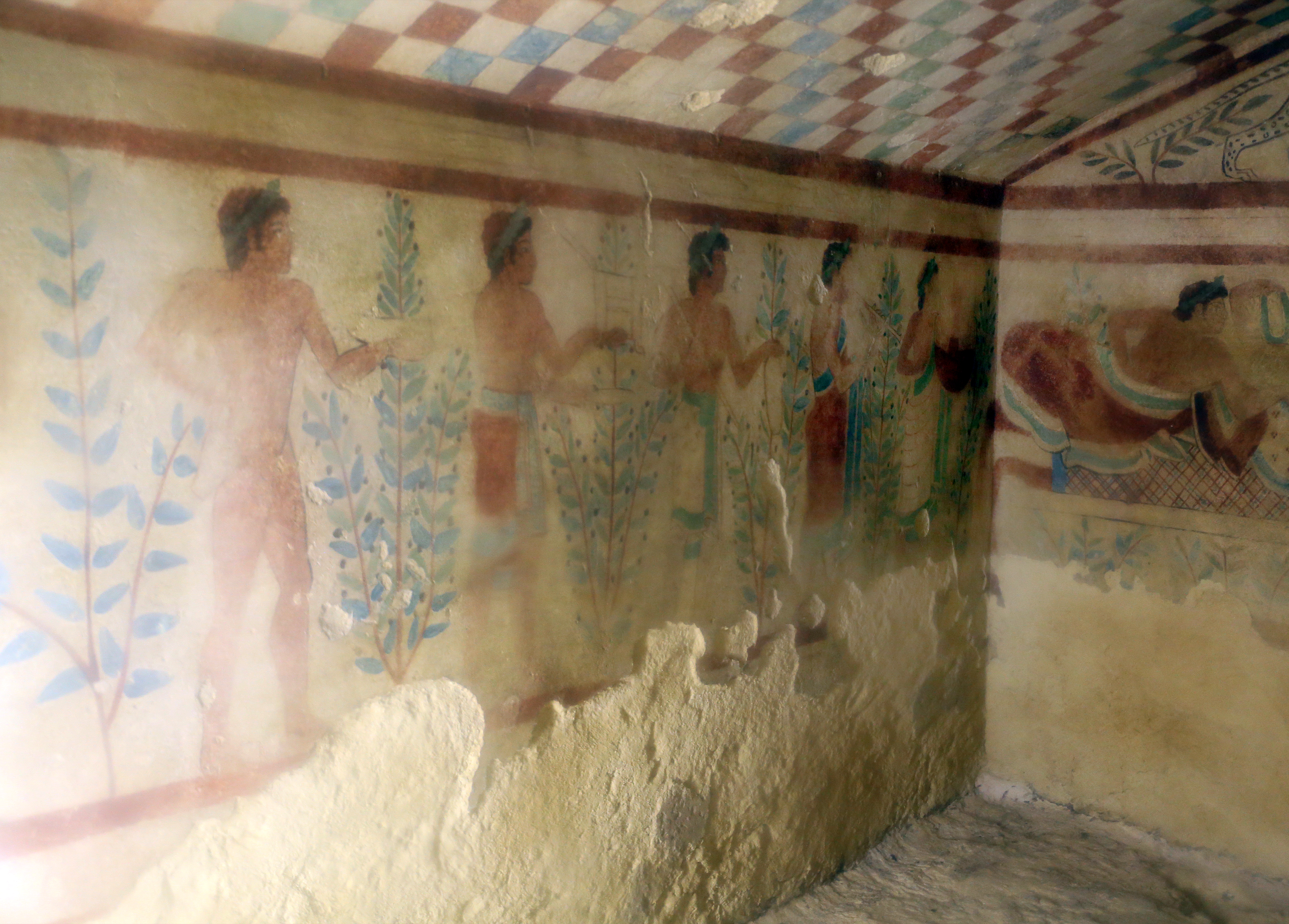
Detail of fresco depicting servants carrying wine jugs and playing musical pipes for the guests.

== See also ==
- Etruscan architecture
- Etruscan art
- Tomb of the Bulls
- Tomb of the Augurs
- Tomb of the Dancers
- Tomb of the Diver
- Tomb of the Triclinium
