= Tomb of the Blue Demons =

Etruscan tomb

Coordinates: 42°14′56″N 11°46′13″E

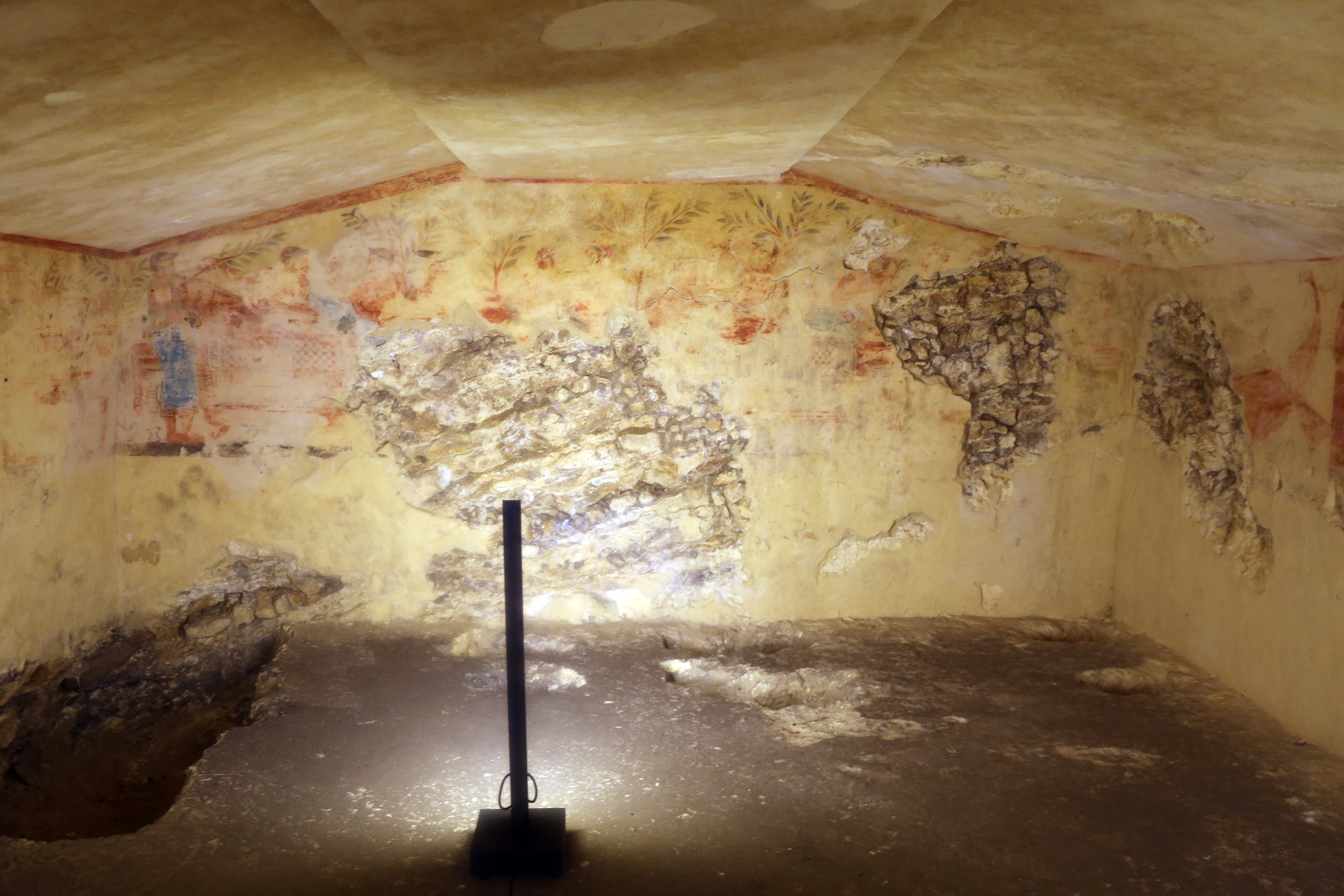
Tomb of the Blue Demons

The Tomb of the Blue Demons (Italian: Tomba dei Demoni Azzurri) is an Etruscan tomb in the Necropolis of Monterozzi near Tarquinia, Italy. It was discovered in 1985. The tomb is named after the blue and black-skinned demons which appear in an underworld scene on the right wall. The tomb has been dated to the end of the fifth century BC.

== Description ==
The fresco on the left wall shows the male deceased riding a biga, a two horse chariot. He is accompanied by musicians in a procession moving rightwards. The fresco on the right wall shows the female deceased. On the far left of the scene is a boat steered by Charon (known as Charun by the Etruscans), the Greek ferryman of the dead. A ribbon hangs on the prow of the boat. A woman holding a branch stands on the shore. She has one hand placed on the head of a young boy in front of her. They face and greet another woman towards their right, flanked by two demons. One demon appears to lead her towards the woman and the boy, but the other holds her around her waist, trying to stop her. On the far right of the scene, two larger demons are shown. The blue demon is on the left, seated on a rock with two snakes in his hands. He faces the black demon on the right, who approaches with exposed teeth, claws and intimidating eyes. The rear wall shows a symposium scene with four or five couples reclining on benches.

== Interpretation ==
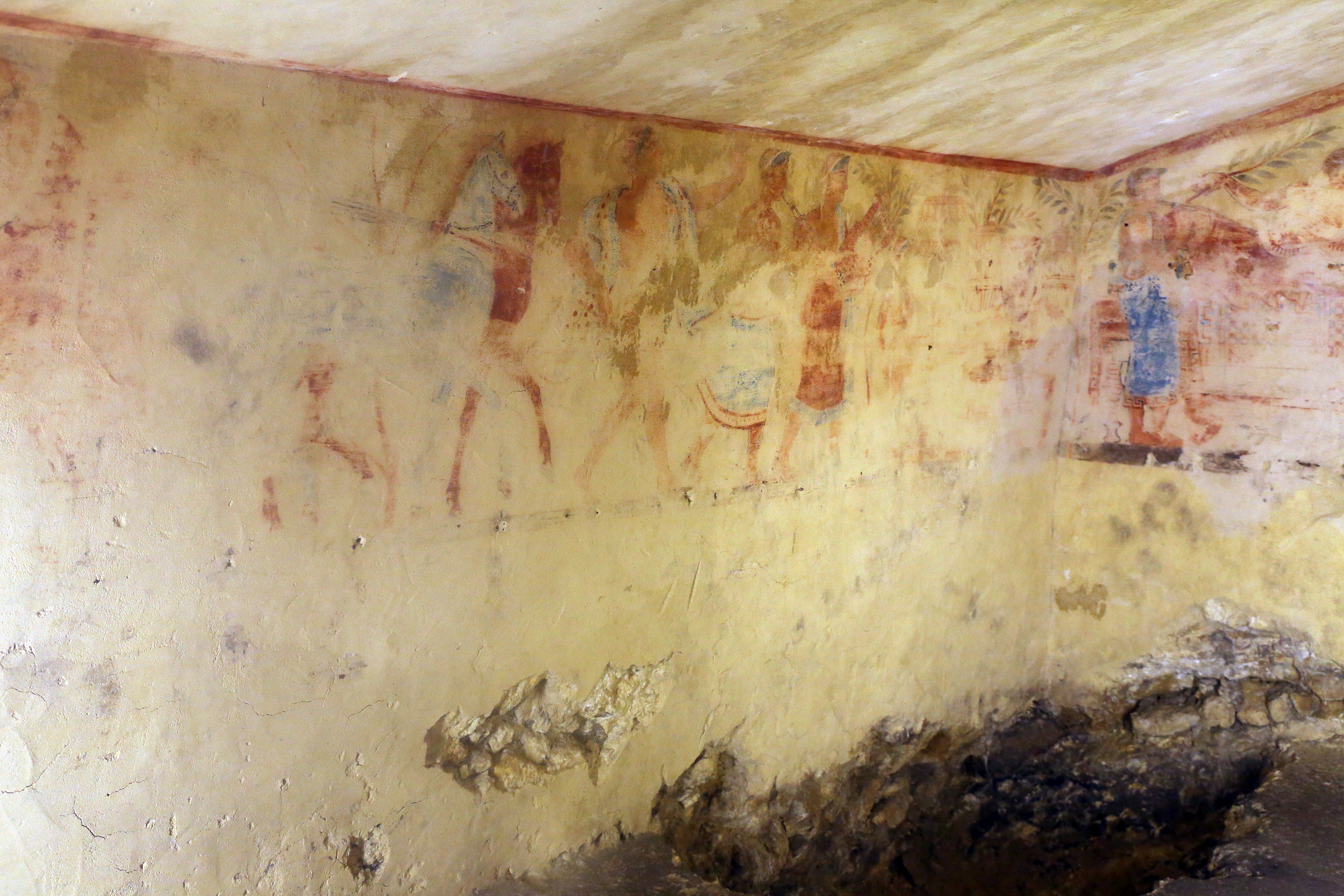
Left wall

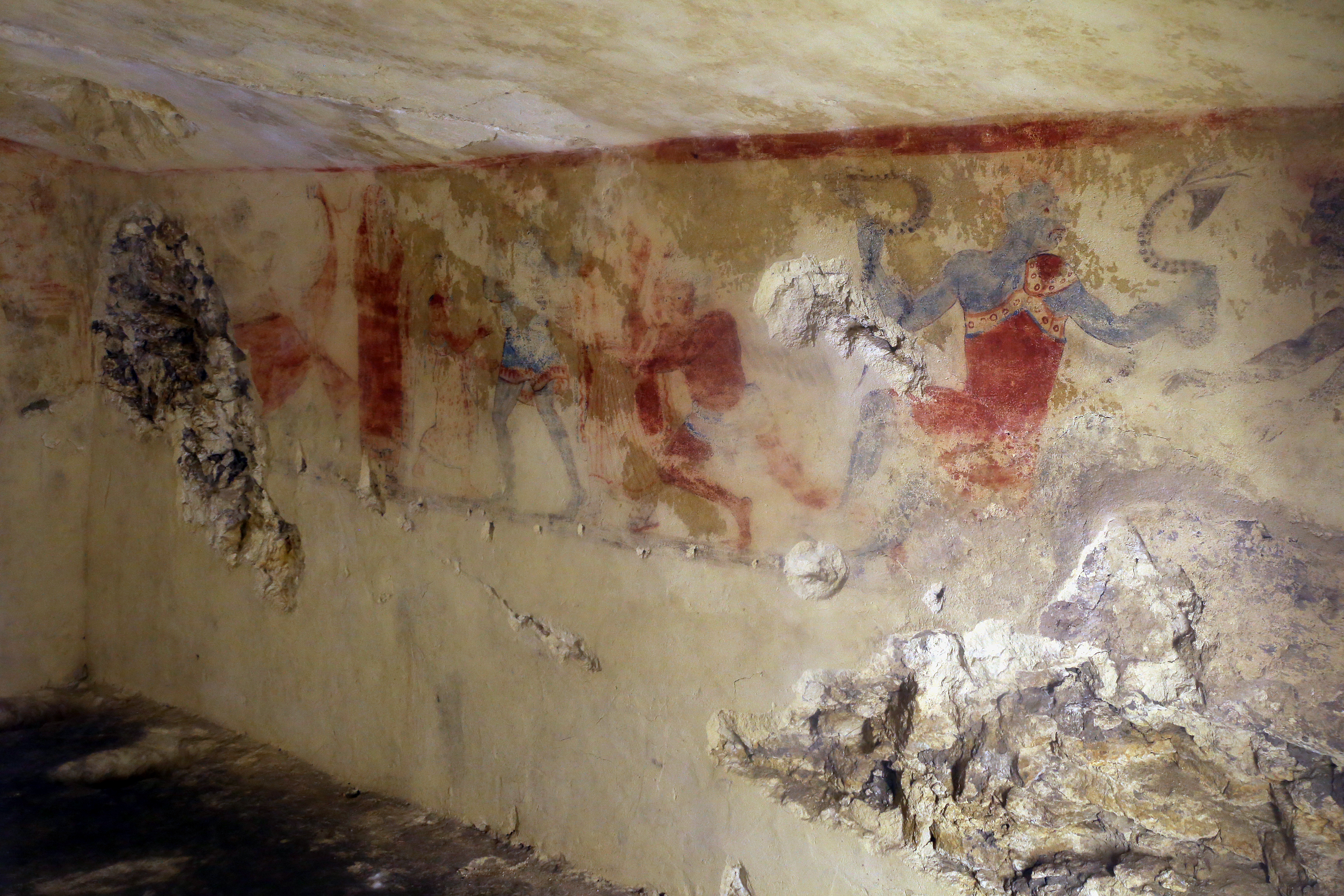
Right wall

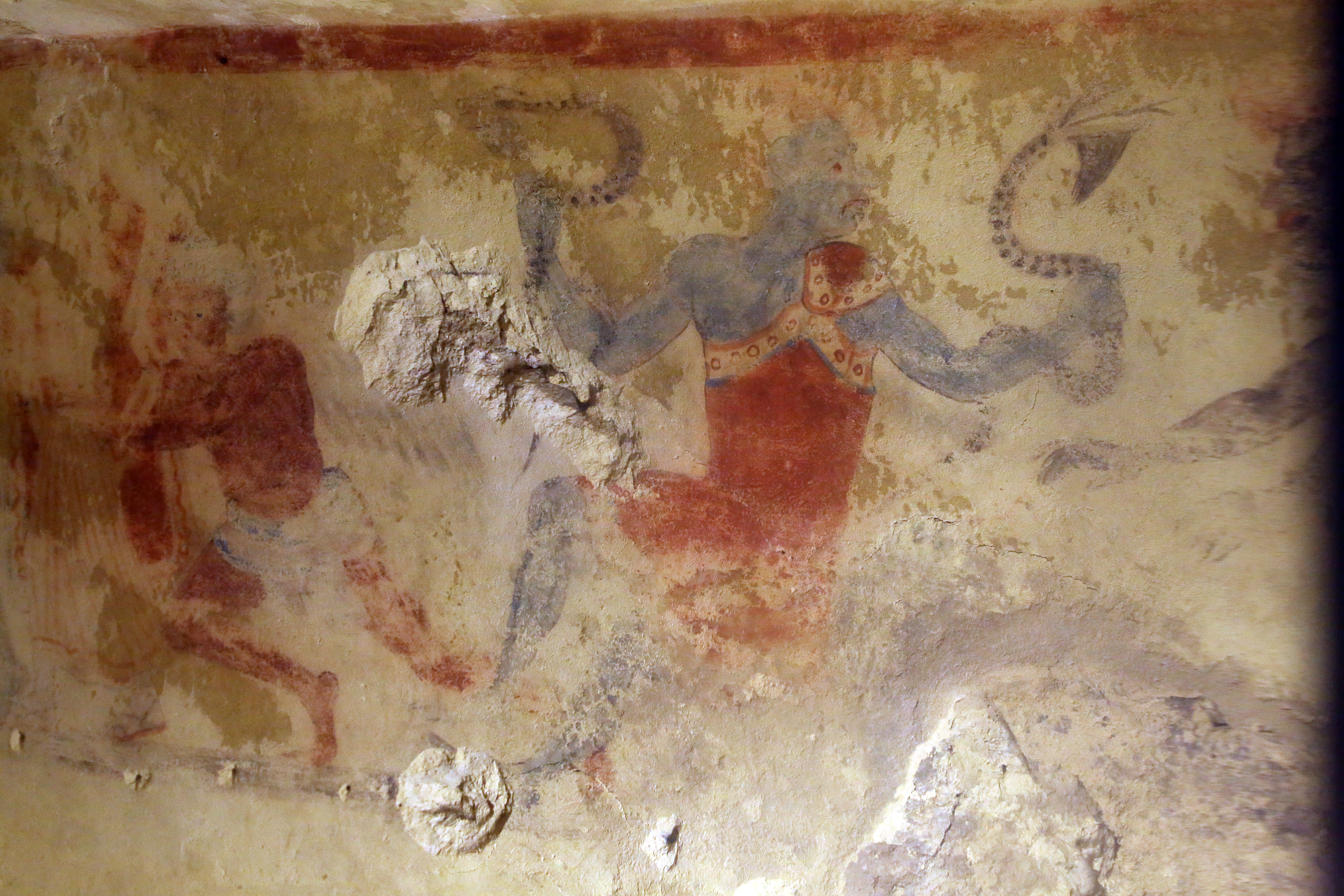
A "blue demon"

The fresco in the right wall is notable for its theme of a dangerous journey to the underworld with threatening demons. This contrasts with the cheerful dancing and symposium scenes in painted tombs of the Etruscan Archaic and Early Classical periods. The Tomb of the Blue Demons provided evidence that Etruscan death demons already existed at the end of the fifth century BC.

The fresco of the procession on the left wall signifies the journey to the afterlife. Likewise, the fresco on the right wall has also been interpreted as the journey of a deceased woman to the underworld, where she meets predeceased family members. It depicts an antechamber to the underworld in which demons guide the deceased woman to the ship for her journey. She walks from the rock or cliff on the right, which is the border with the world of the living, towards the boat, which is the boundary with the underworld. It is also possible for the inhabitants of the underworld to enter from the other side, like the women with the boy. The ship of the Etruscan Charun is seaworthy, unlike the skiff of his Greek counterpart. The banquet on the rear wall depicts both the festivities of the living for the funeral and of the deceased in the afterlife.

Like many other elements of Etruscan religion, the demons shown on the right wall were probably inspired by the ancient Greek religion. The black-skinned demon bears some similarity to depictions of Thanatos and the blue-skinned demon resembles Eurynomos.

== Sources ==
- Haynes, Sybille (2000). Etruscan Civilization: A Cultural History. Los Angeles, California: Getty Publications. ISBN 978-0-89236-600-2.
- Krauskopf, Ingrid (2006). "The Grave and Beyond in Etruscan Religion". In Grummond, Nancy Thomson de; Simon, Erika (eds.). The Religion of the Etruscans. Austin, Texas: University of Texas Press. ISBN 978-0-29278-233-4.
