= Monterozzi necropolis =

Etruscan necropolis in Lazio, Italy

- Necropoli dei Monterozzi (Italian)
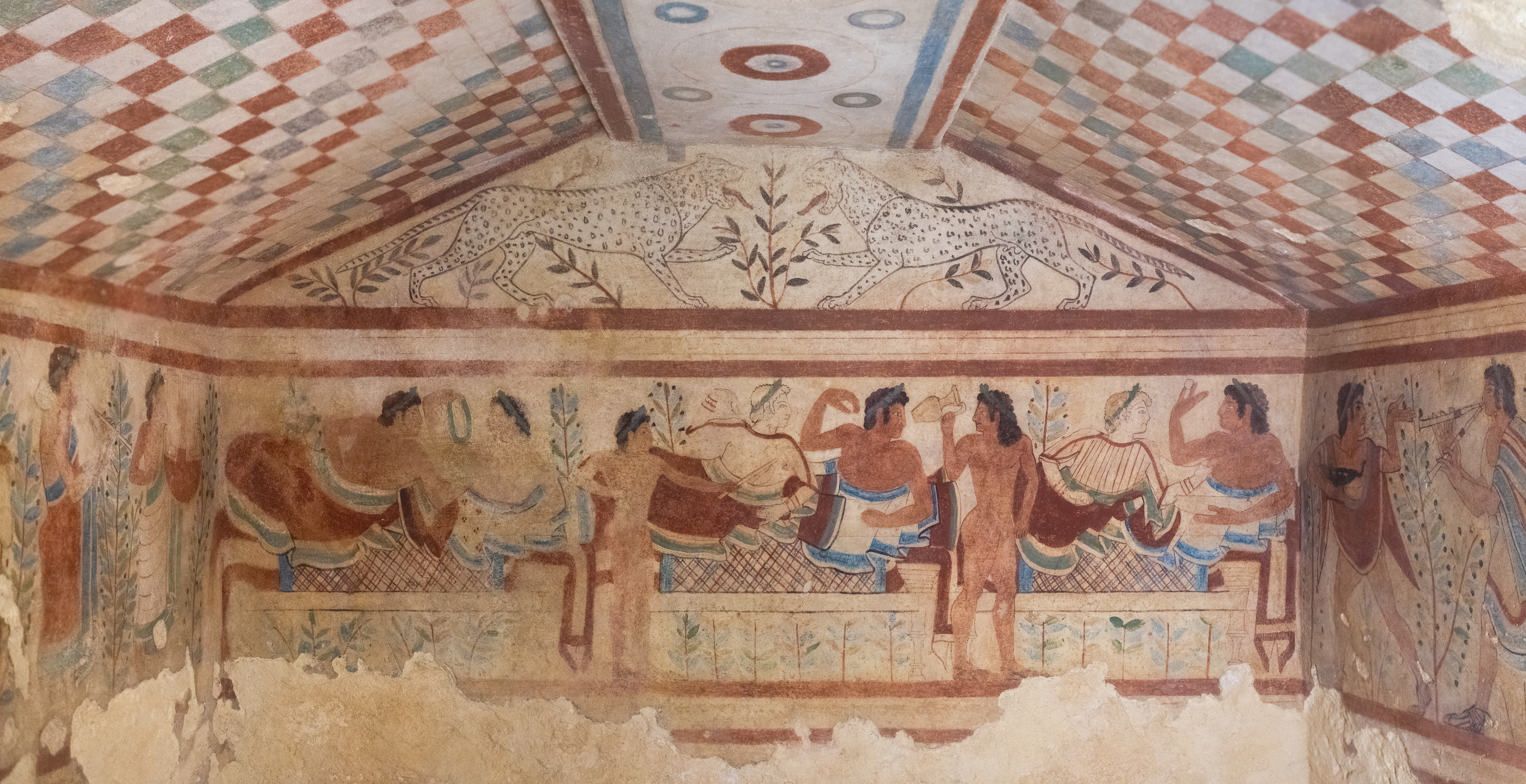
- Painting: Tomb of the Leopards

- Location within Italy
- 42°15′02″N 11°46′12″E
- Type: Necropolis
- Location: Tarquinia, Lazio, Italy
- Region: Etruria

History
- Built: 7th century BC

Site notes
- Management: Soprintendenza per i Beni Archeologici dell'Etruria Meridionale
- Website: Museum and Necropolis of Tarquinia and Cerveteri

UNESCO World Heritage Site
- Official name: Etruscan Necropolises of Cerveteri and Tarquinia
- Type: Cultural
- Criteria: i, iii, iv
- Designated: 2004 (28th session)
- Reference no.: 1158
- Region: Europe and North America

The Monterozzi necropolis (Italian: Necropoli dei Monterozzi) is an Etruscan necropolis on a hill east of Tarquinia in Lazio, Italy. The necropolis has about 6,000 graves, the oldest of which dates to the 7th century BC. About 200 of the tomb chambers are decorated with frescos.

The painted tombs of the necropolis are the largest documentation of Etruscan pictorial art, and they are singular testaments to Etruscans' quotidian life, ceremonies, and mythology. Some of the tombs are monumental, cut in rock and topped by tumuli, accessible by means of inclined corridors or stairways. Many different subjects are shown in the frescos, including rituals, animals, magical themes, dance and musical instruments. The best known tombs are the Tomb of the Leopards, of Hunting and Fishing, of the Augurs, of the Triclinium, the Blue Demons and of the Bulls.

Many of the artifacts found in the necropolis and some of the frescos have been brought to the neighboring Tarquinia National Museum in order to preserve them. The paintings and wall decorations of the Tomb of the Baron, discovered in 1827, were also reproduced on the walls of the so-called Etruscan Cabinet in the Castle of Racconigi.

Along with the Banditaccia Necropolis, Monterozzi was designated as a UNESCO World Heritage Site in 2004, notable as "the depiction of daily life in the frescoed tombs, many of which are replicas of Etruscan houses, is a unique testimony to this vanished culture".

== Description ==
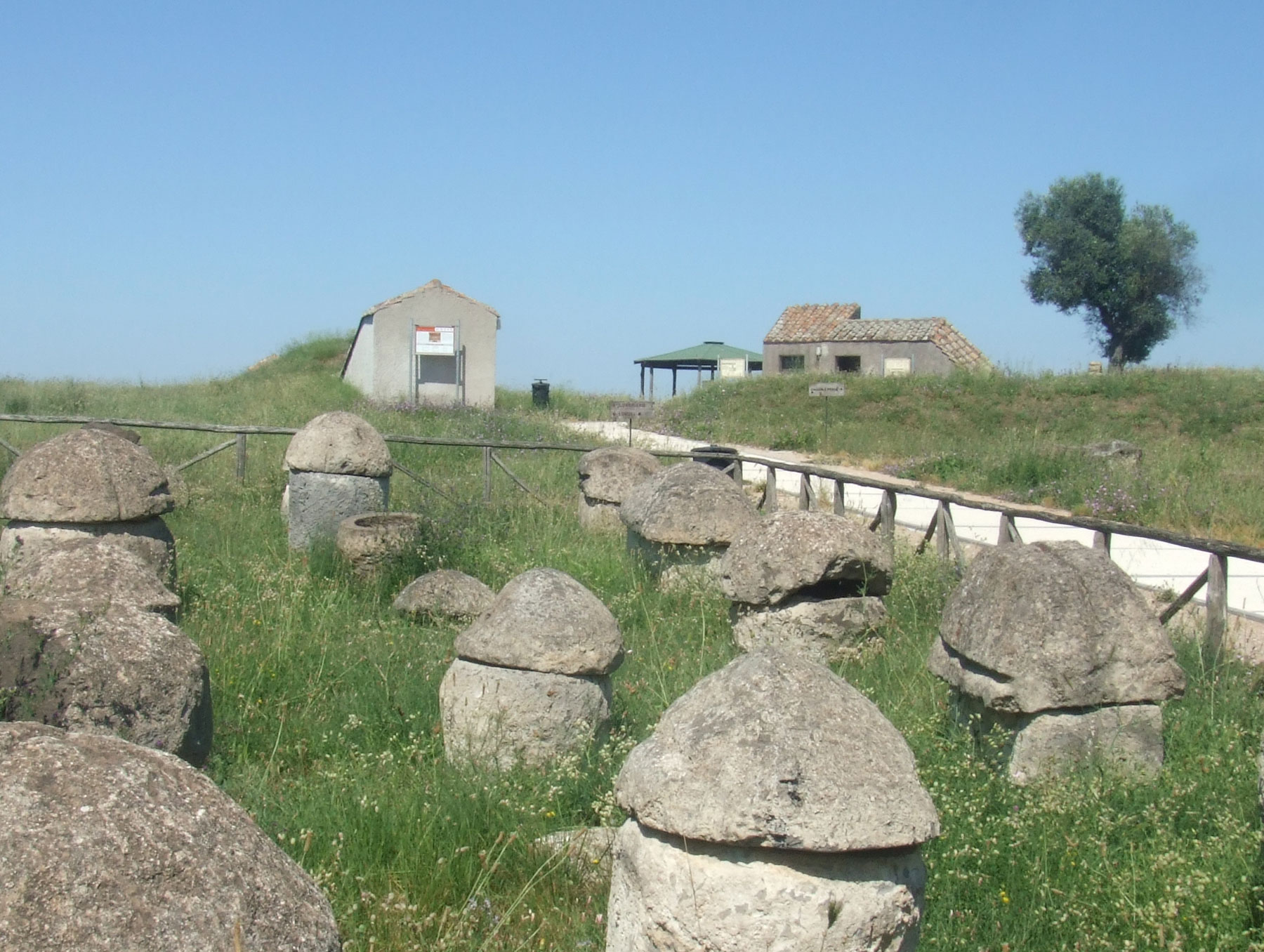
Buildings now replace the surface mounds (tumuli) to protect the subterranean tombs. Foreground: early Villanovan tombs

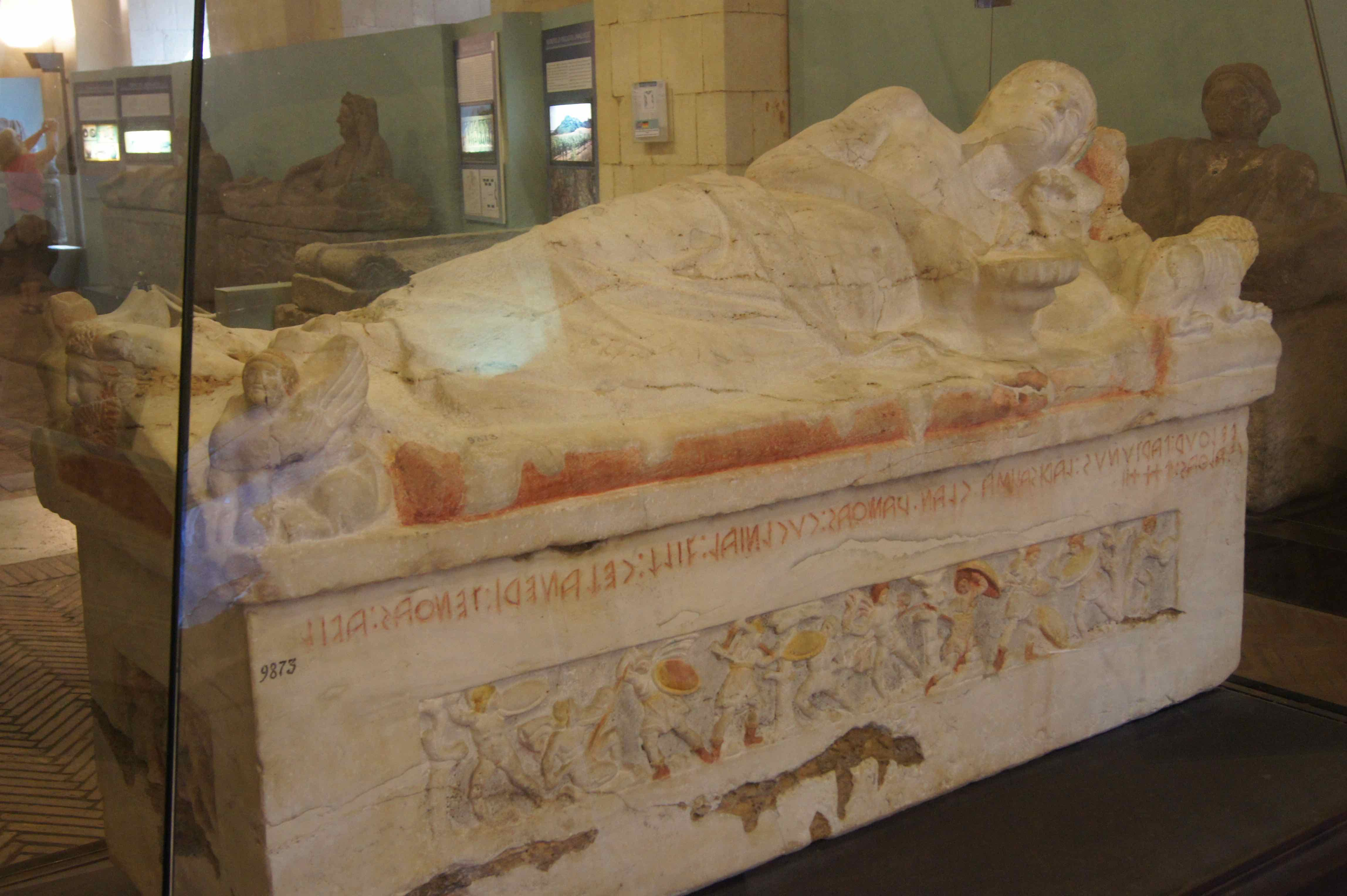
Painted Etruscan Sarcophagus from a tomb

The burial ground dates from the Iron Age, or Villanovan period (9th century BC), up to Roman times. From the Villanovan period simple round tombs carved from rock for cremation burials can be seen at the site.

Towards the end of the 8th century BC, the first funerary chambers appeared as family tombs due to the rise to power of an aristocracy. These appeared on the surface as tumuli, sometimes assuming impressive proportions to enhance the power and prestige of the nobles, as can be seen especially in the so-called King and Queen tombs. There were about 600 tumuli still visible in the 19th century, following which many were razed after excavation.

The tumuli usually covered subterranean chambers carved into the rock, containing sarcophagi and personal possessions of the deceased, and many of which have wall paintings.

The earliest sarcophagi are carved with the image of the deceased supine on the lid. The later and more numerous types show him or her reclining on the left side, facing the spectator and frequently holding a libation vessel; occasionally a man displays an inscribed scroll listing his ancestry and the magisterial offices he occupied. During the second half of the 4th century BC sculpted and painted sarcophagi of nenfro, marble and alabaster came into use. They were deposited on rock-carved benches or against the walls in the now very large underground chambers.

Sarcophagi were also decorated with reliefs of symbolic or mythological content, often derived from Tarentine models. Sarcophagi of this type, which continue until the second century, are found in such numbers at Tarquinia that they must have been manufactured locally. The walls of the tomb-chambers of the late period are painted with underworld demons escorting the dead on their journey to the beyond, scenes in the nether world, processions of magistrates and other symbols of the rank of the eminent members of the families buried there.

Among the most notable painted tombs famous for the artistic quality of their frescoes are:

- the Tomb of the Leopards has some of the best preserved frescoes
- the Tomb of the Augurs
- the Tomb of Hunting and Fishing
- the Tomb of the Triclinium
- the Tomb of the Blue Demons
- the Tomb of the Bulls, the earliest tomb decorated with complex frescoes dated to either 540–530 BC or 530–520 BC. It is one of the rare Etruscan tombs which have erotic frescoes
- the Tomb of the Whipping. It is also one of the rare Etruscan tombs which have erotic frescoes.
- the Tomb of Orcus is notable for having the only known pictorial depiction of the Etruscan daemon Tuchulcha
- the Tomb of the Bigas

== Gallery ==
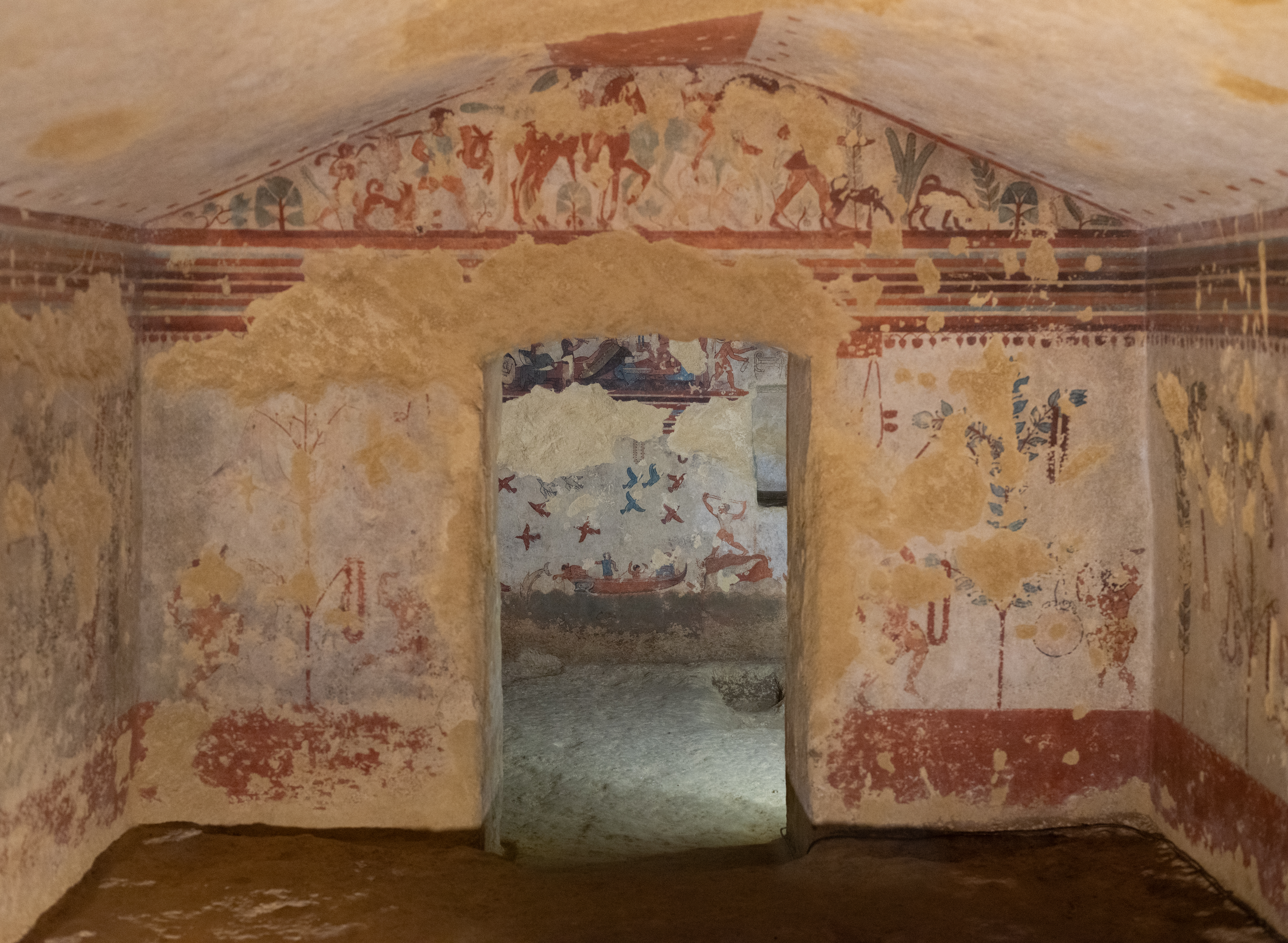
Tomb of Hunting and Fishing

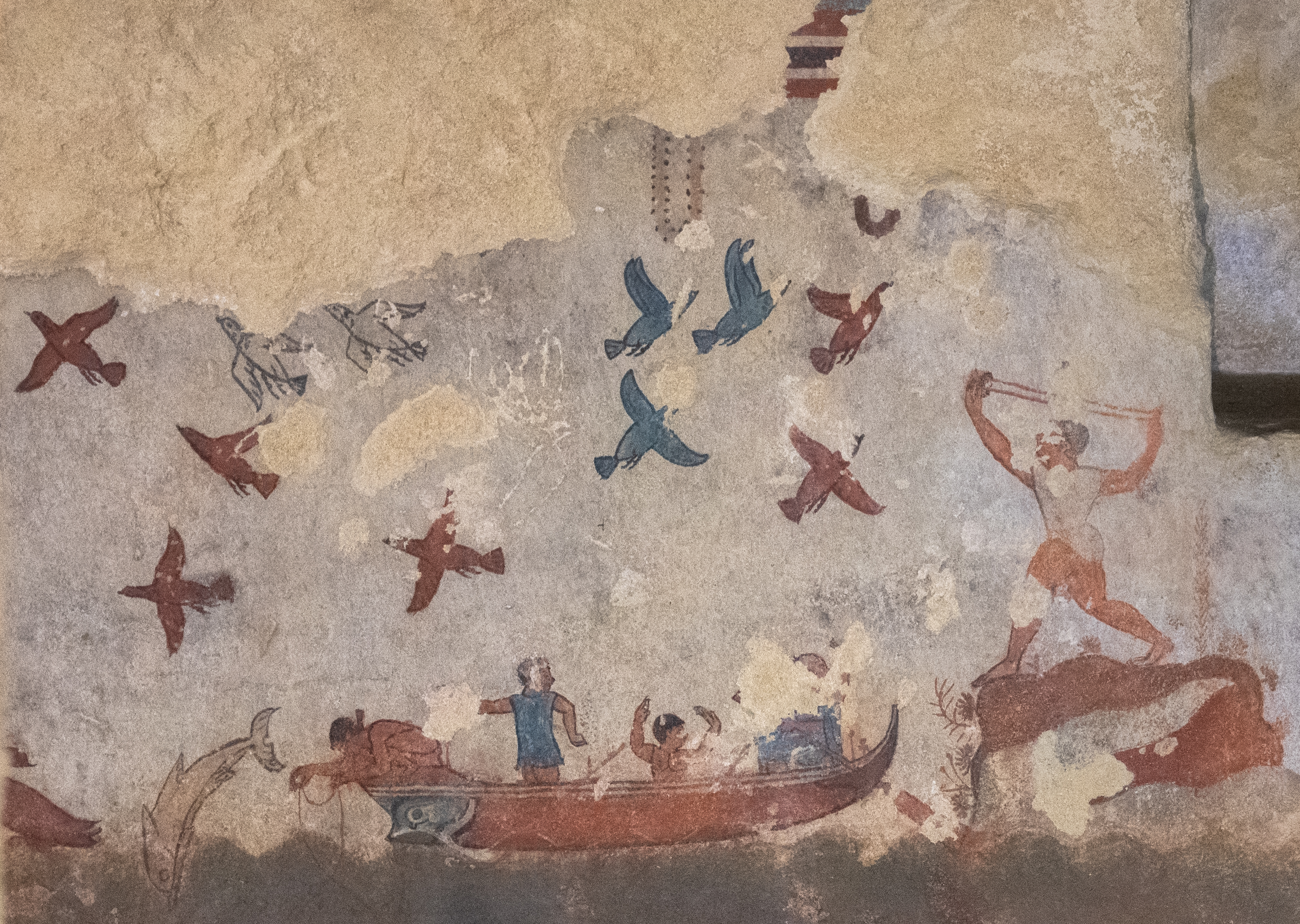
Tomb of Hunting and Fishing — backroom fresco

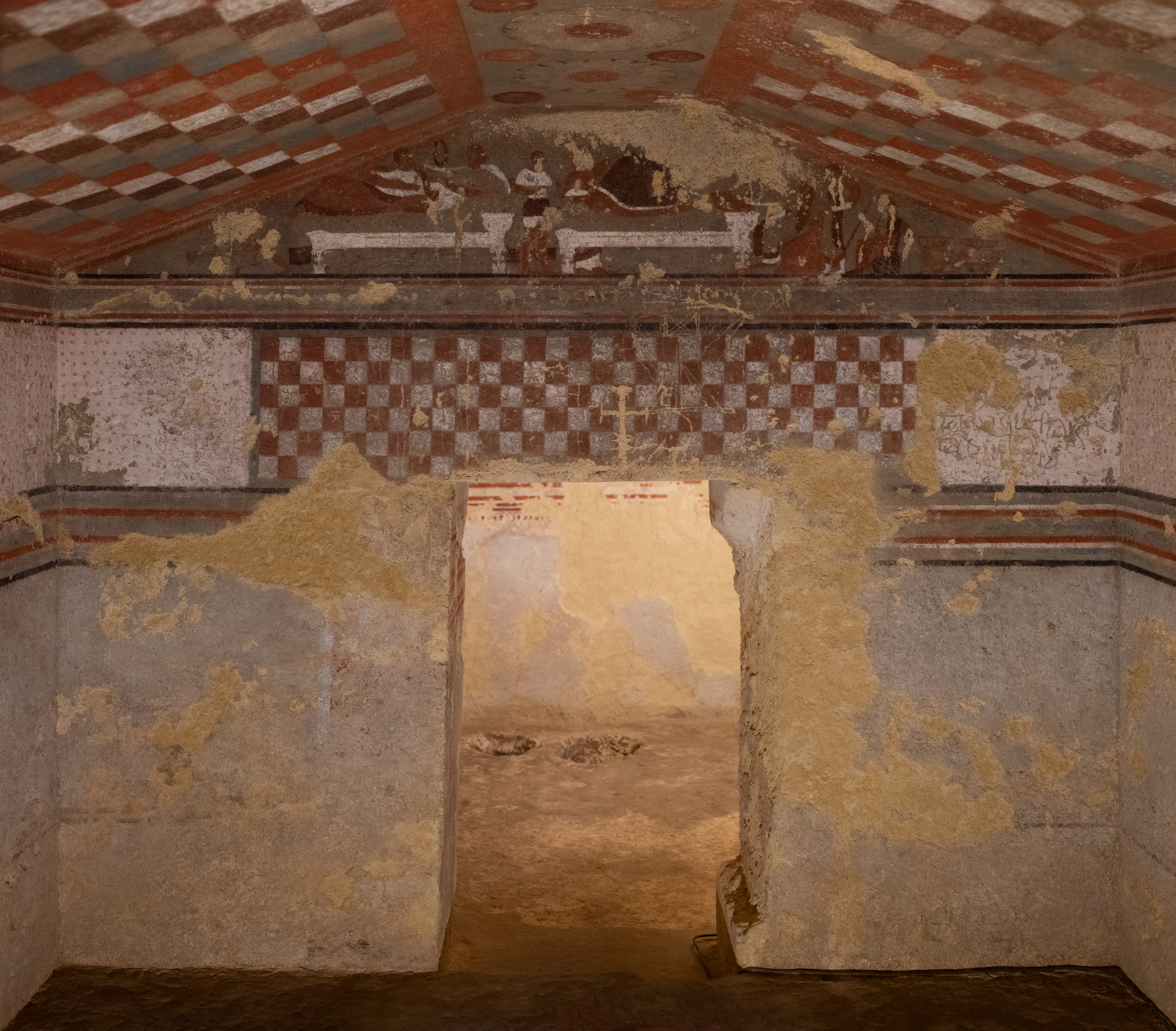
Bartoccini Tomb

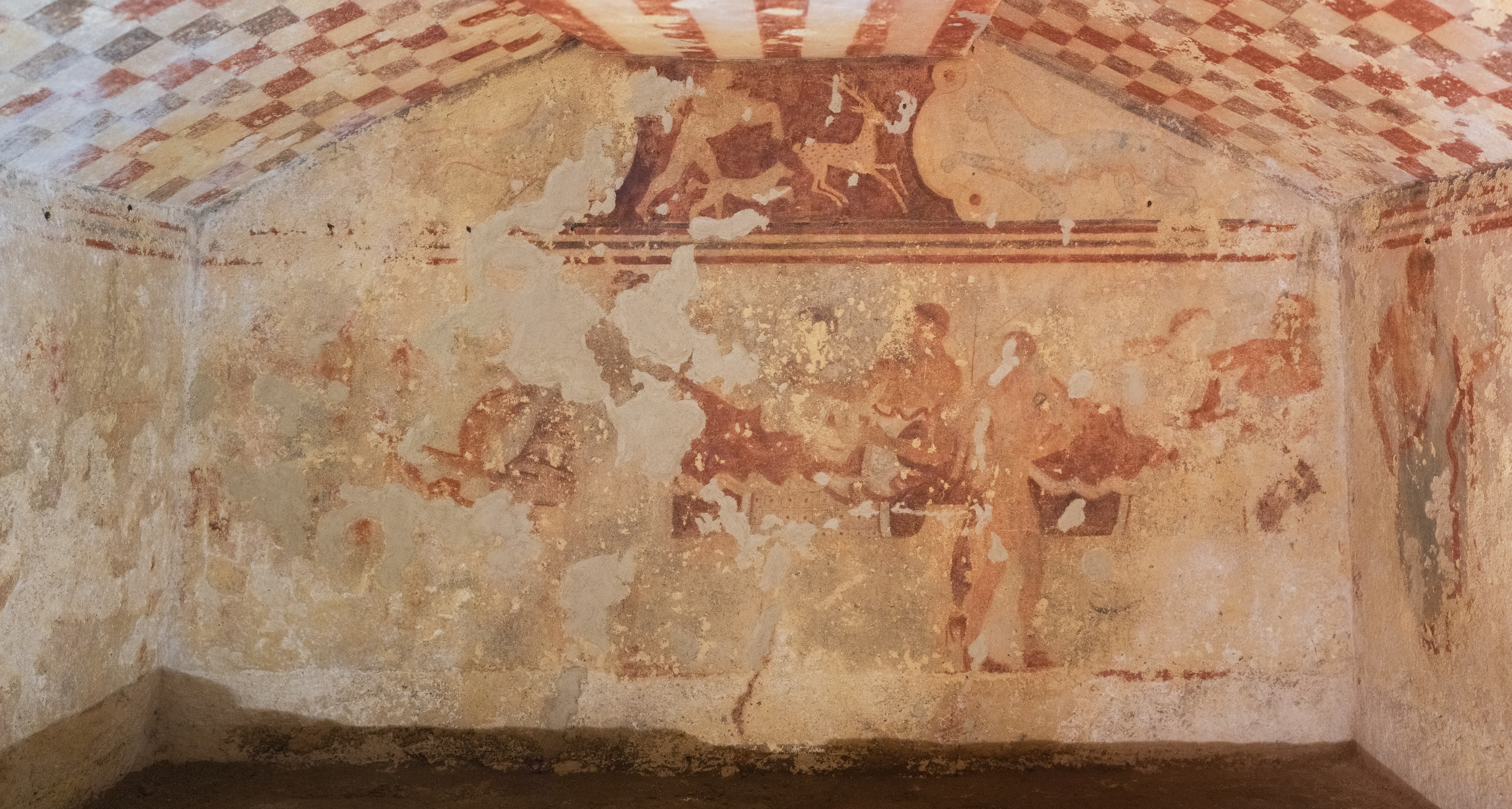
Tomb of the Deer Hunt

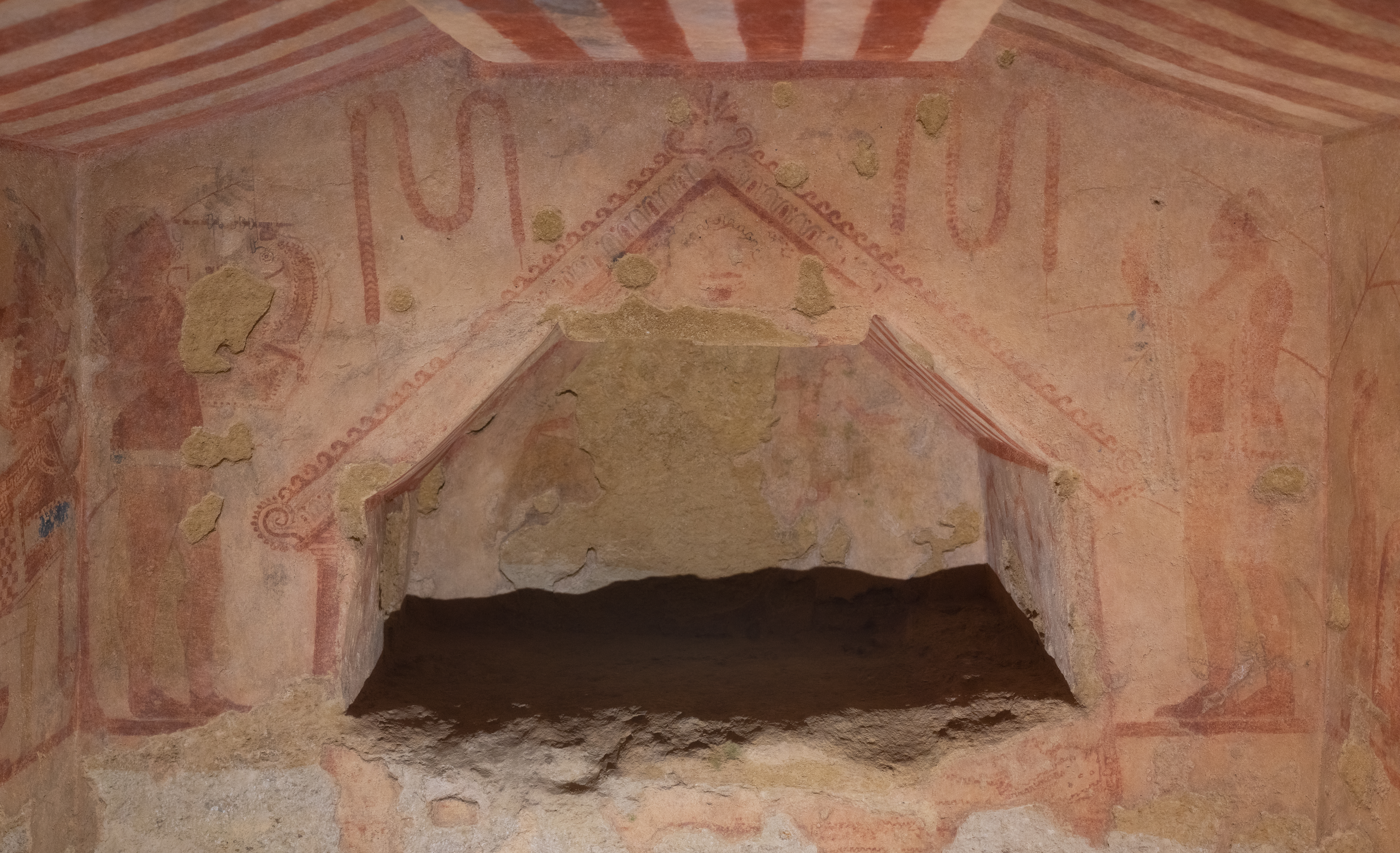
Tomb of the Pulcella

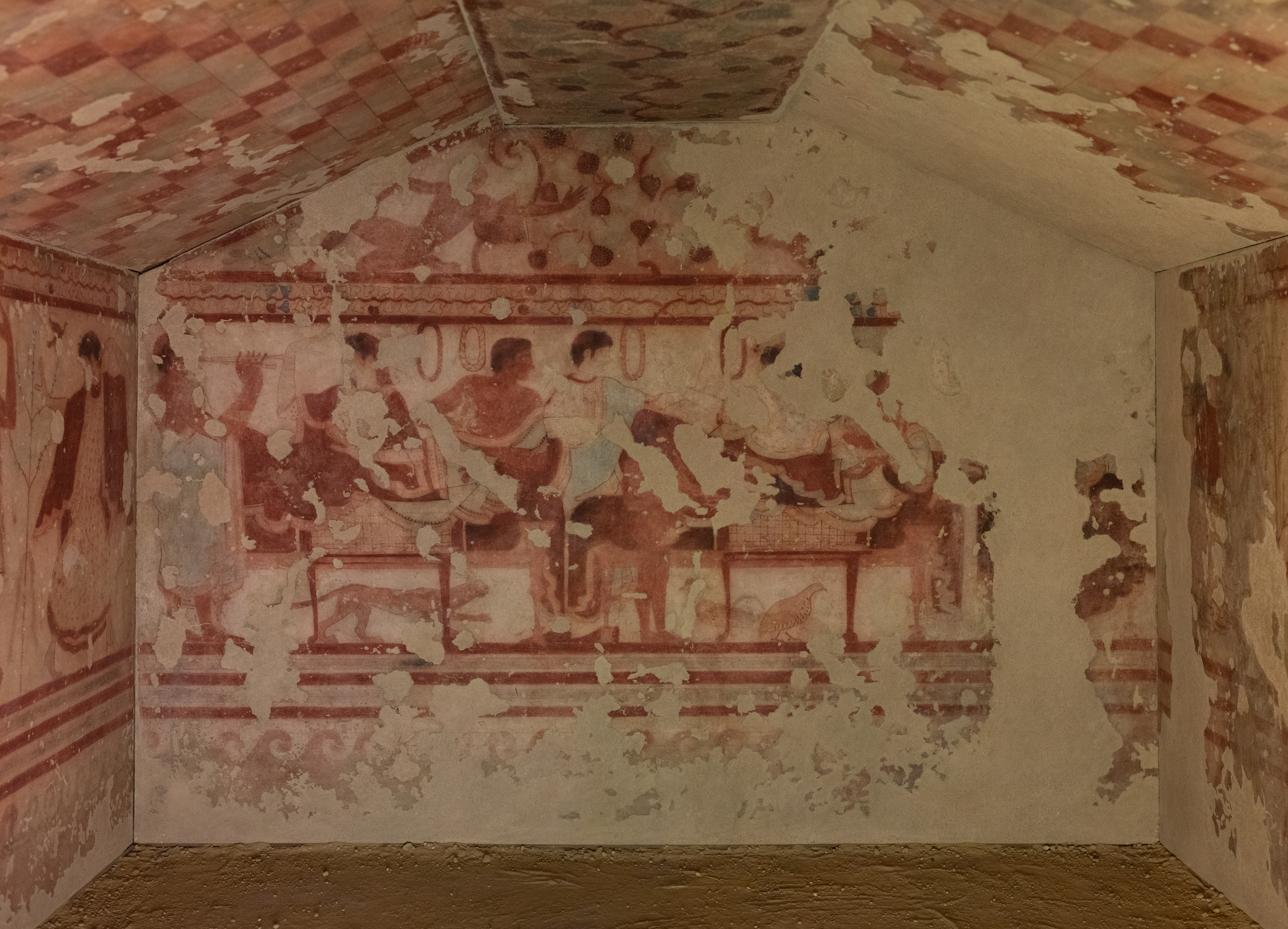
Tomb of the Triclinium

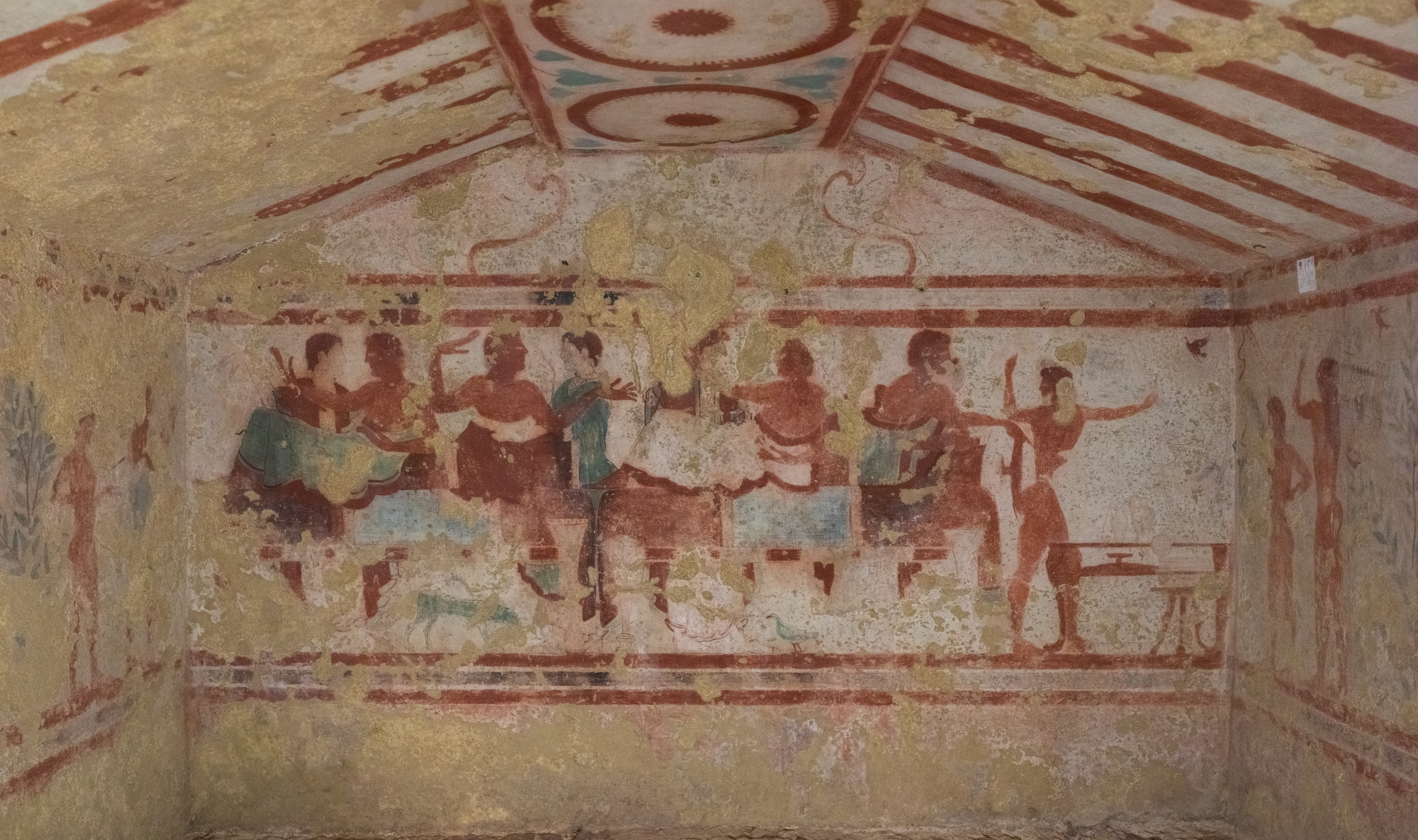
Claudio Bettini Tomb

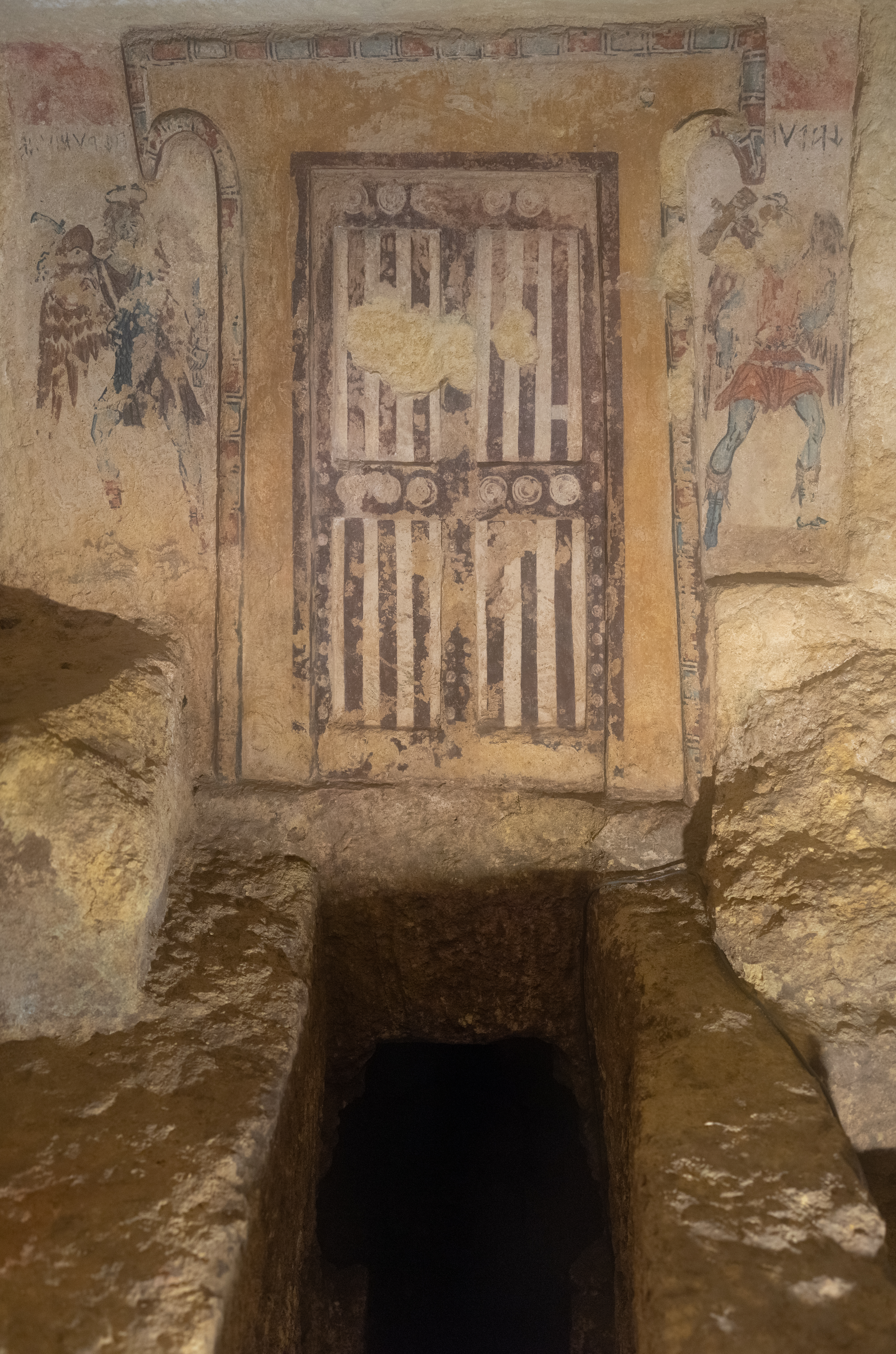
Tomb of Charuns

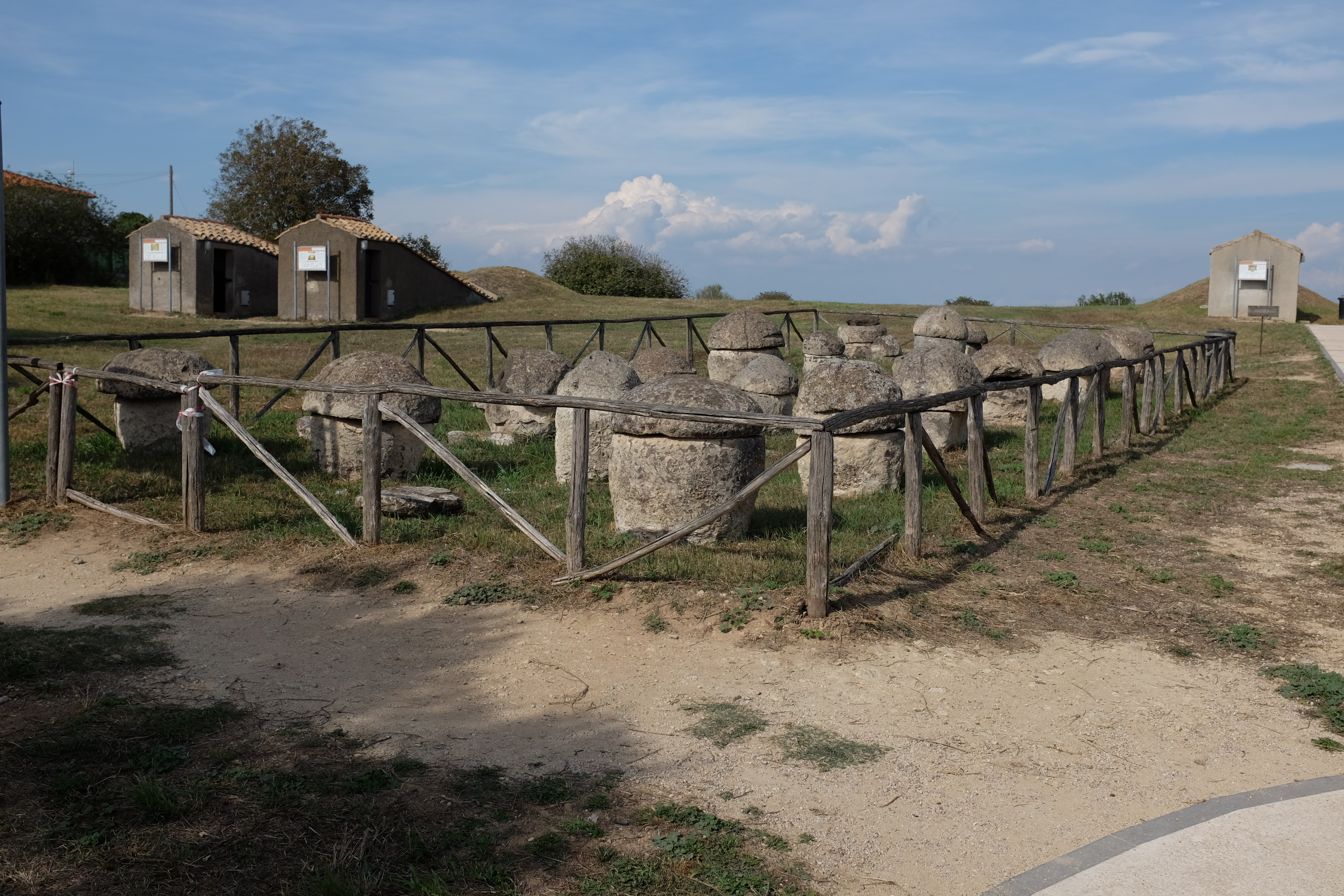
Villanovan period tombs for cremation burials

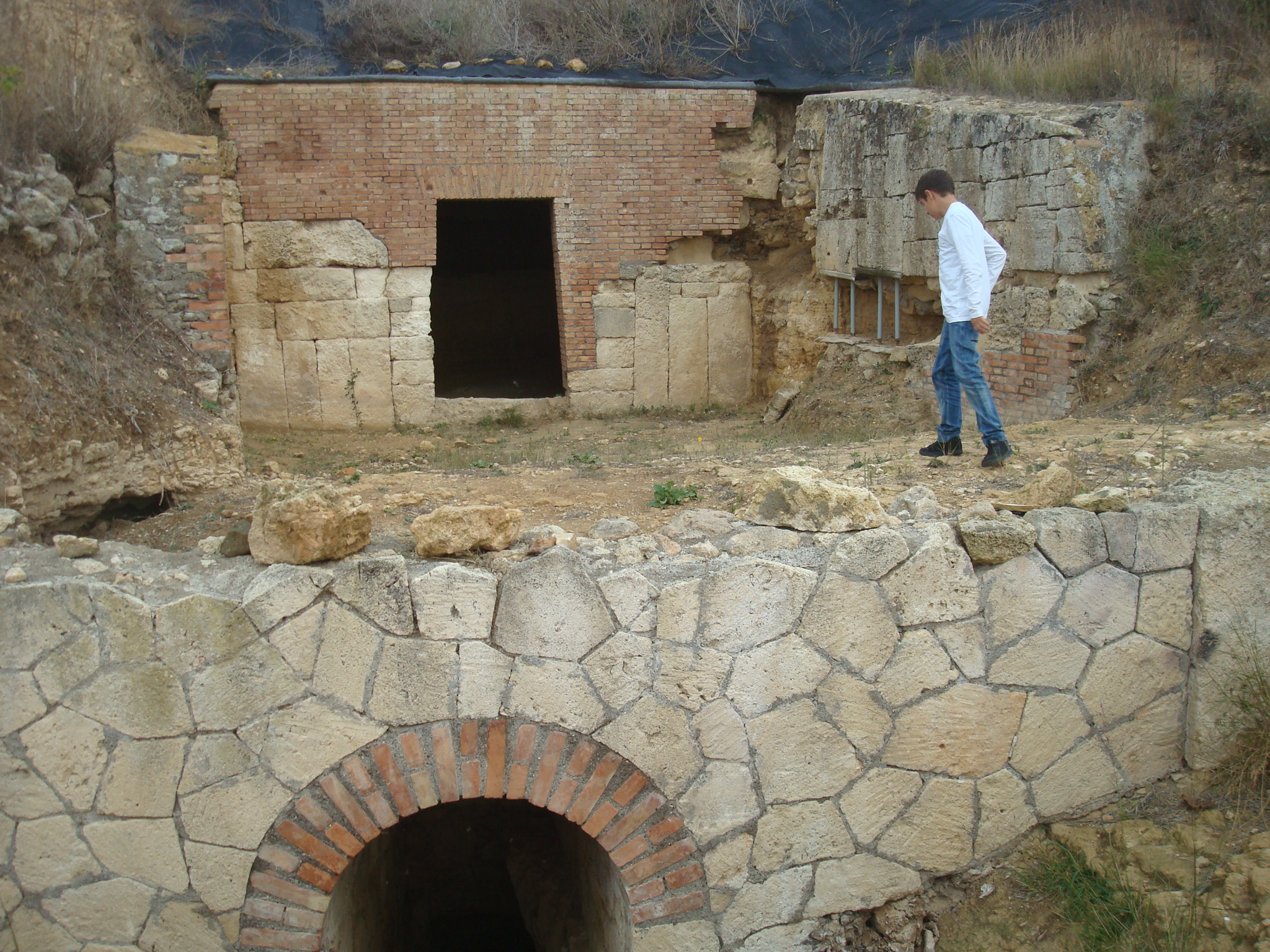
Tumuli

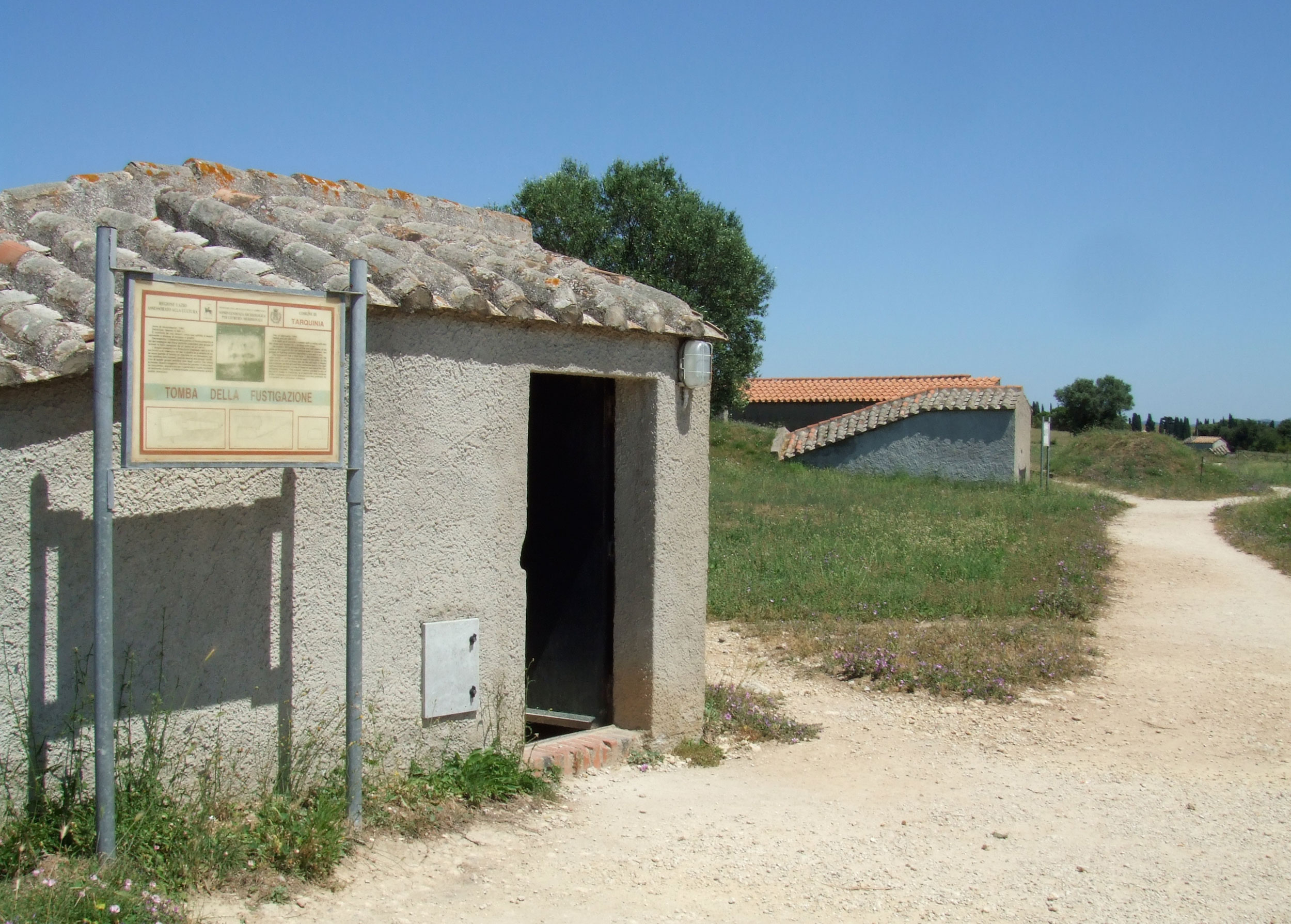
Entrance to the Tomb of the Whipping

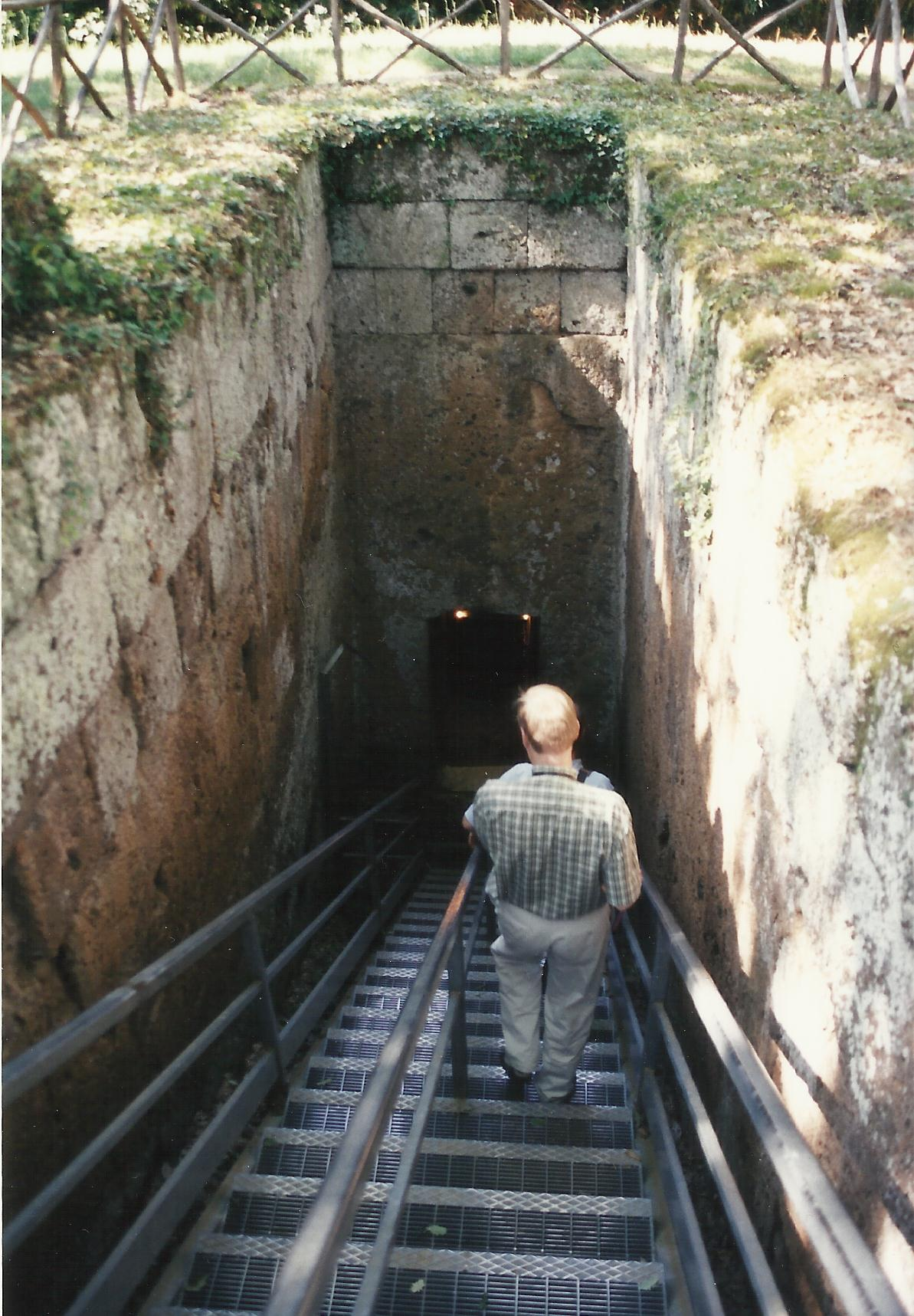
Entrance to a tomb

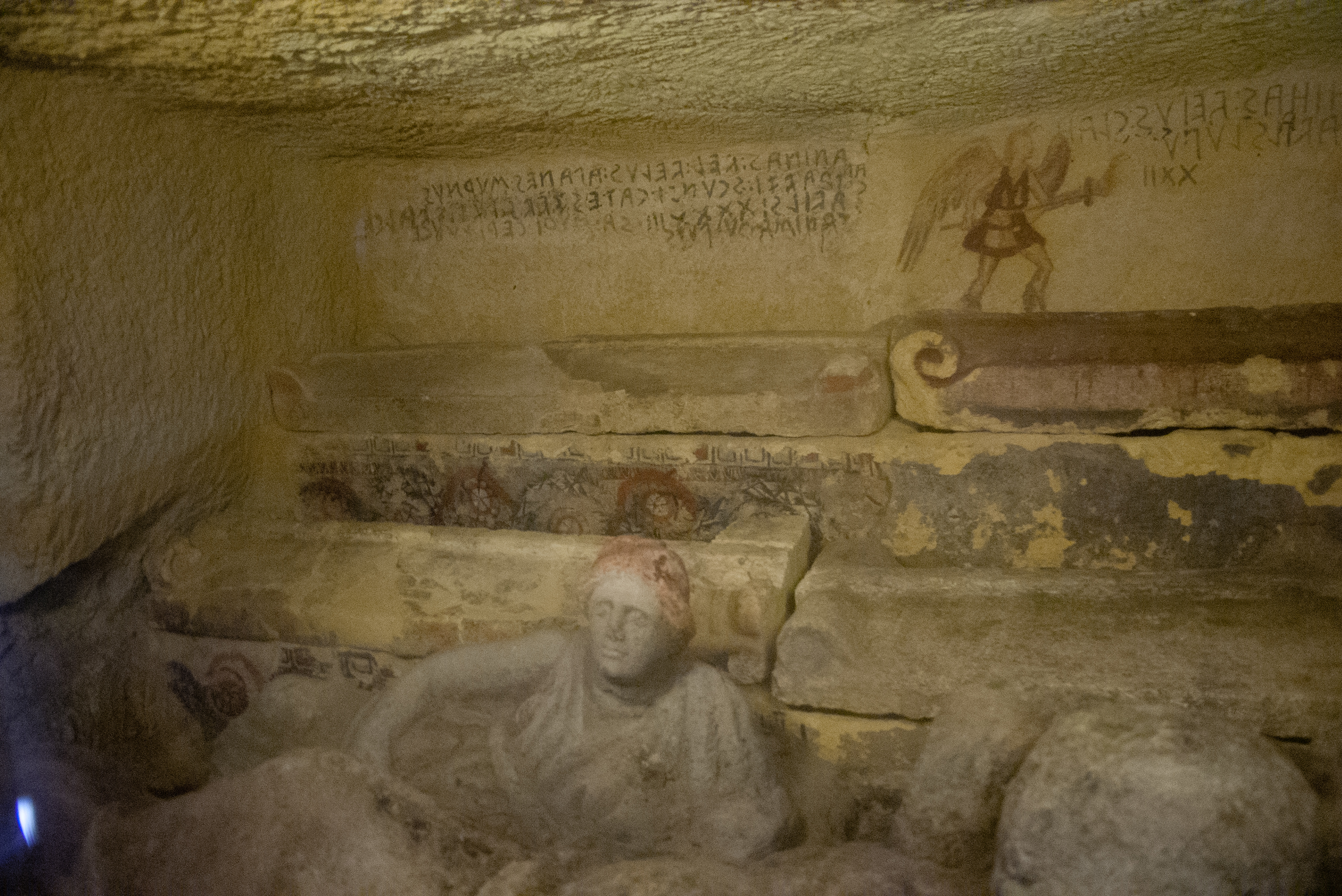
Tomb of Anina

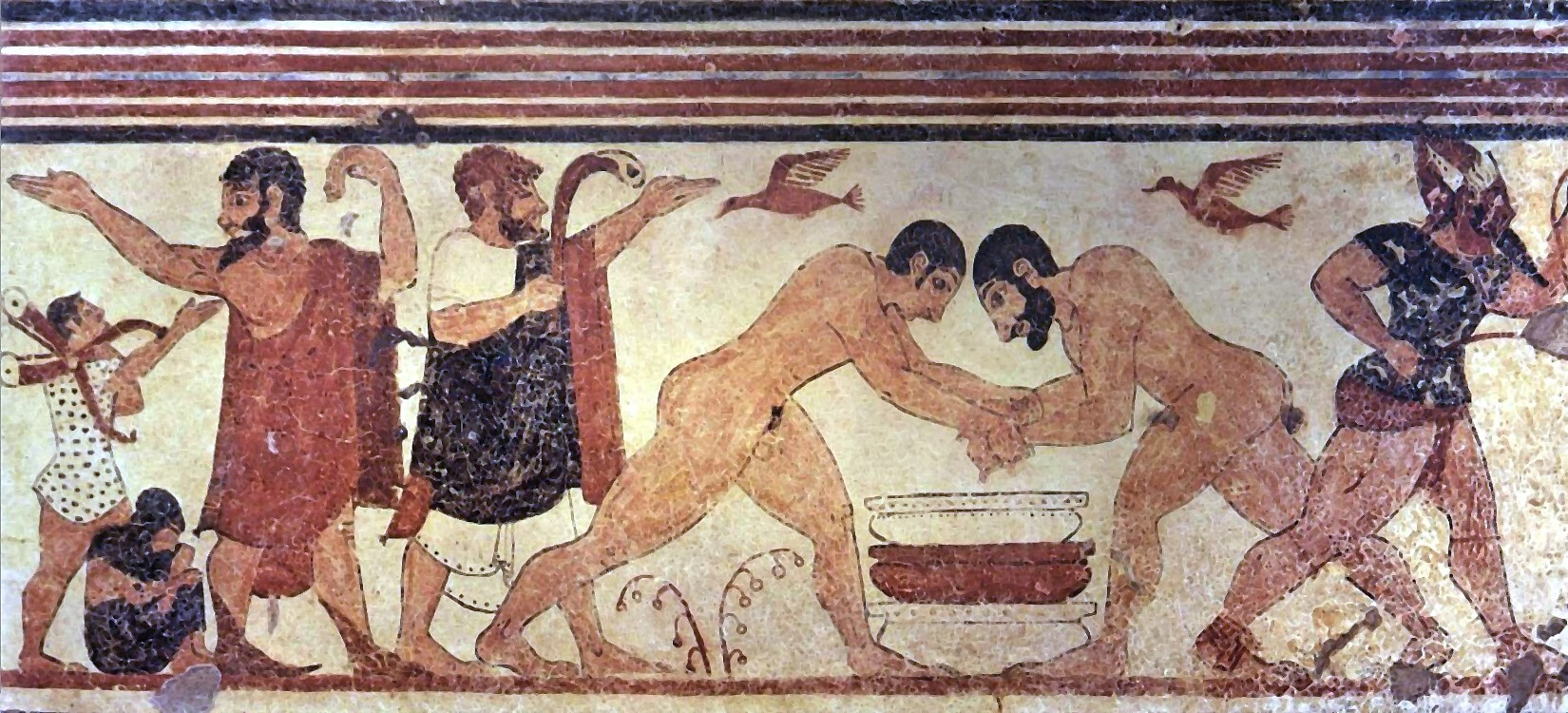
Tomb of the Augurs

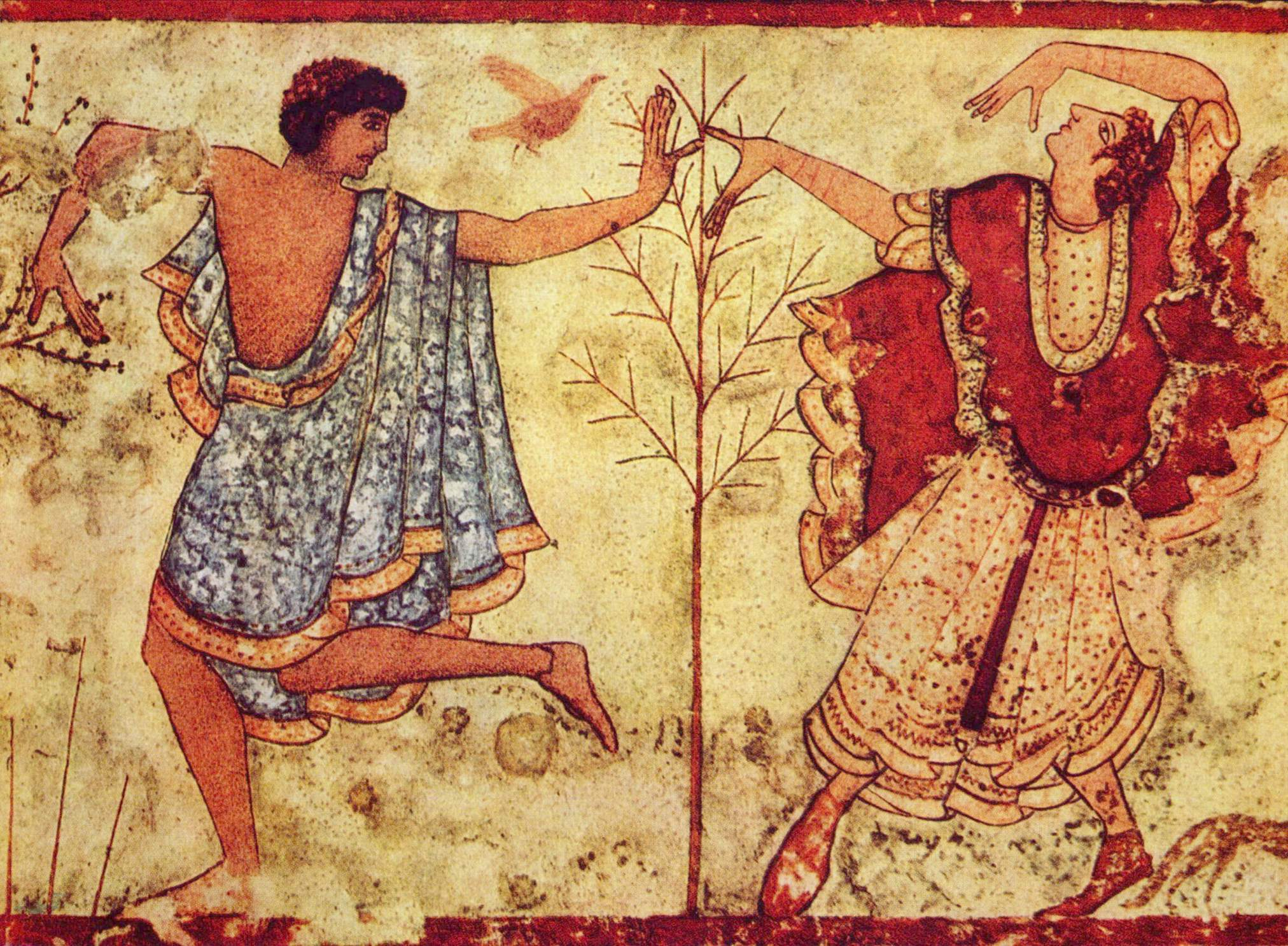
Tomb of the Triclinium

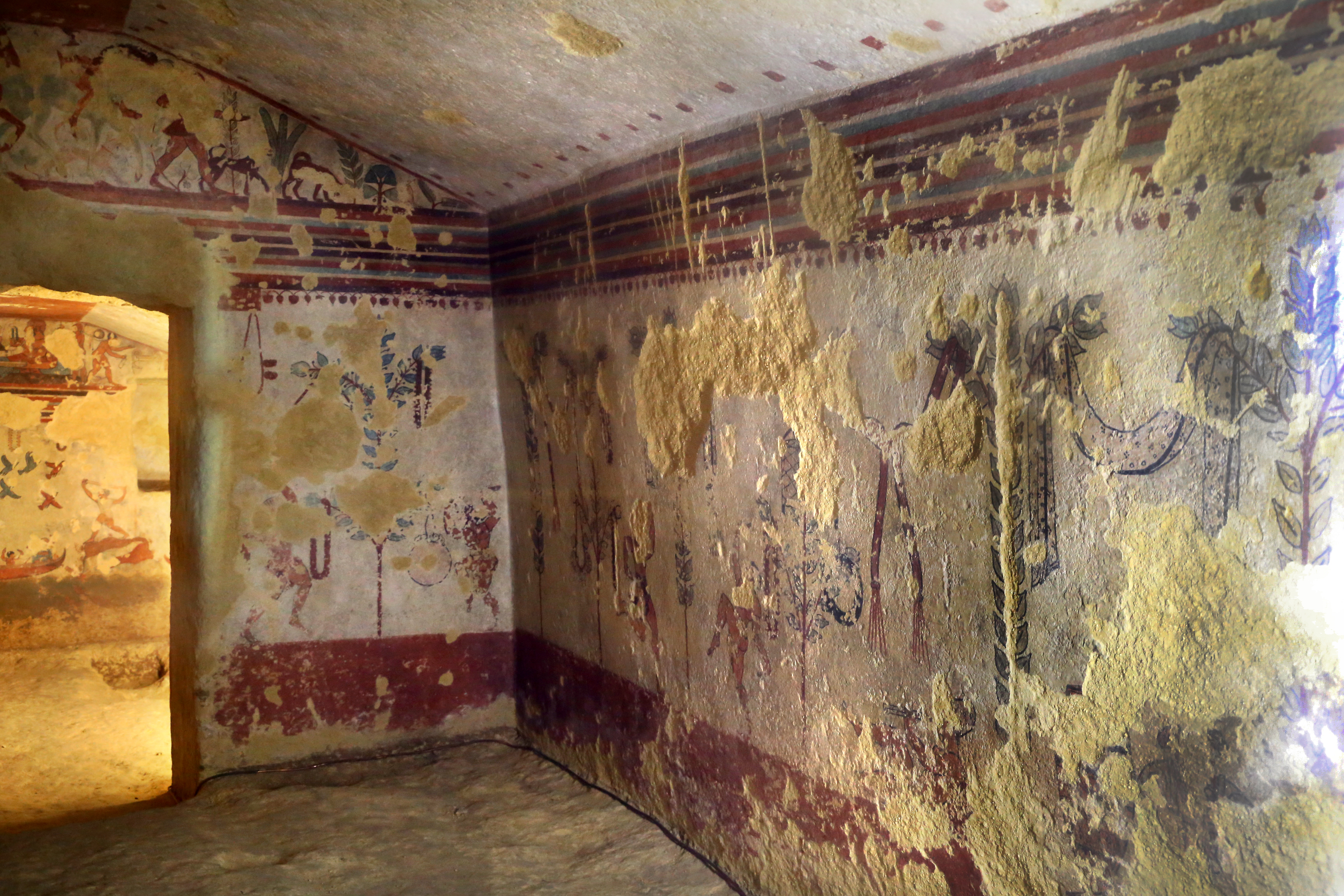
Tomb of Hunting and Fishing

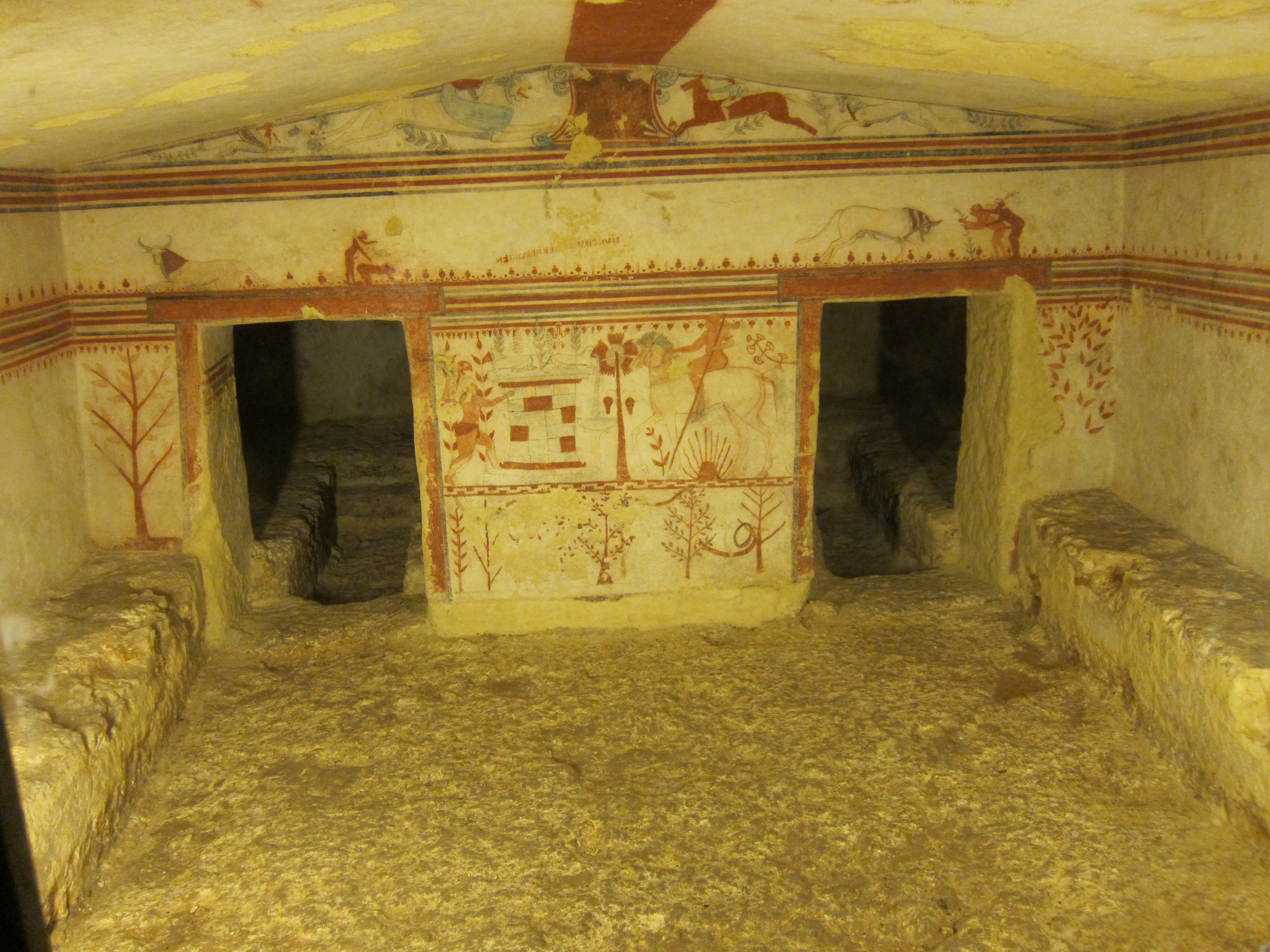
Tomb of the Bulls

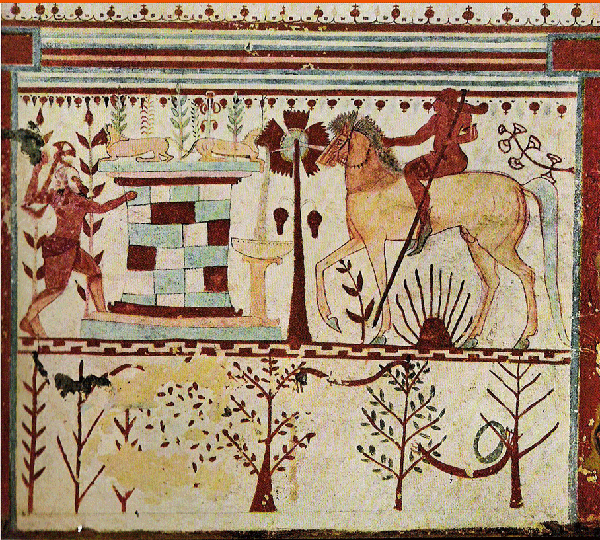
Tomb of the Bulls

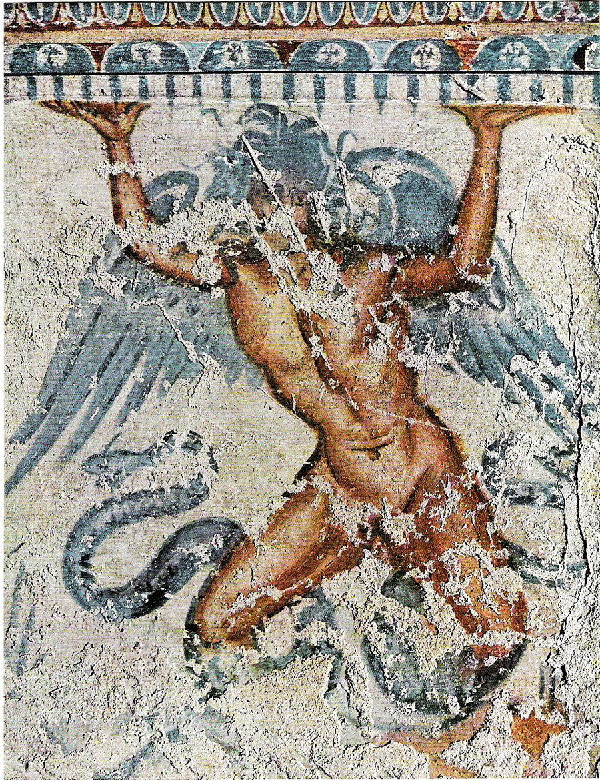
Mural of Typhon

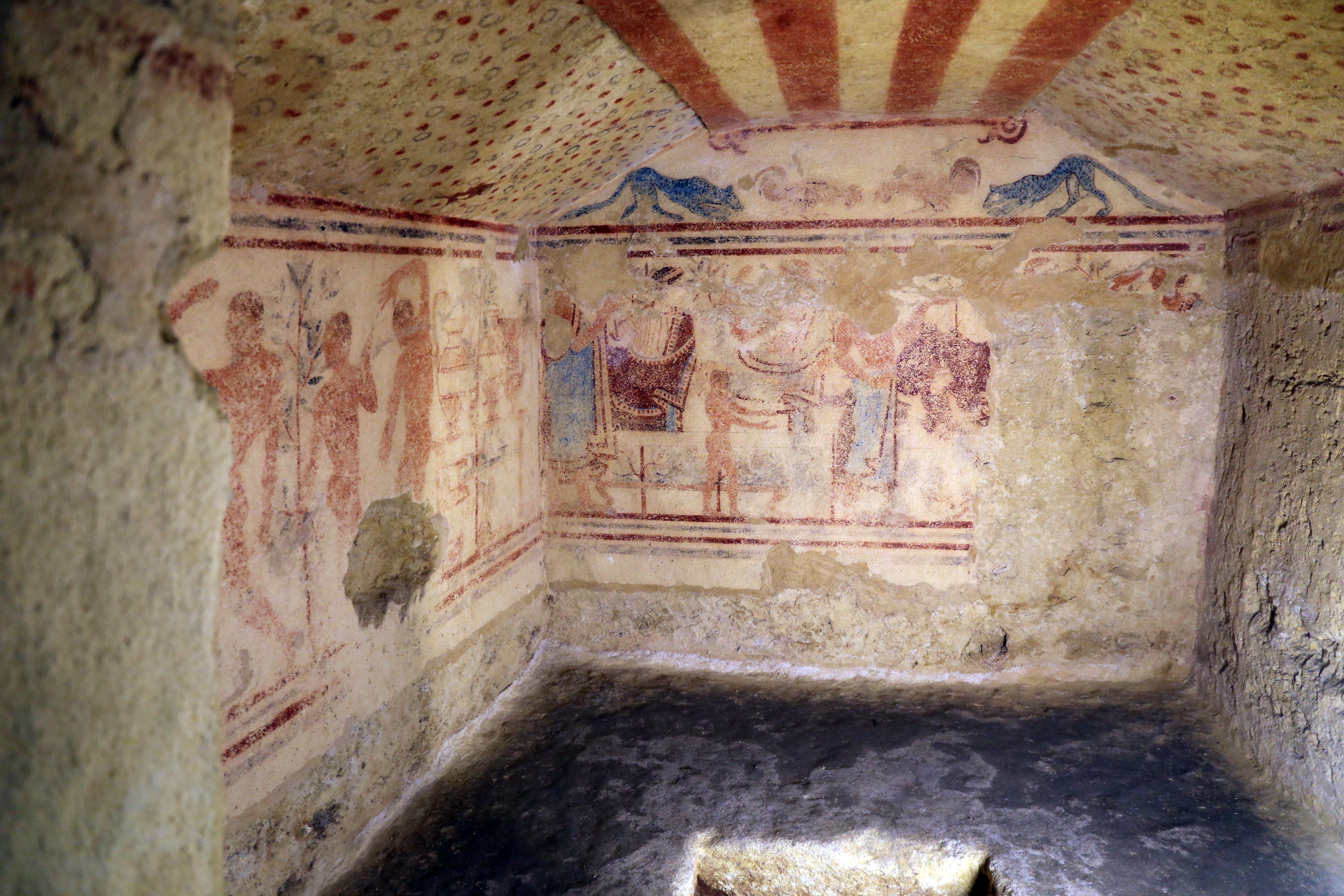
Tomb of the Warrior

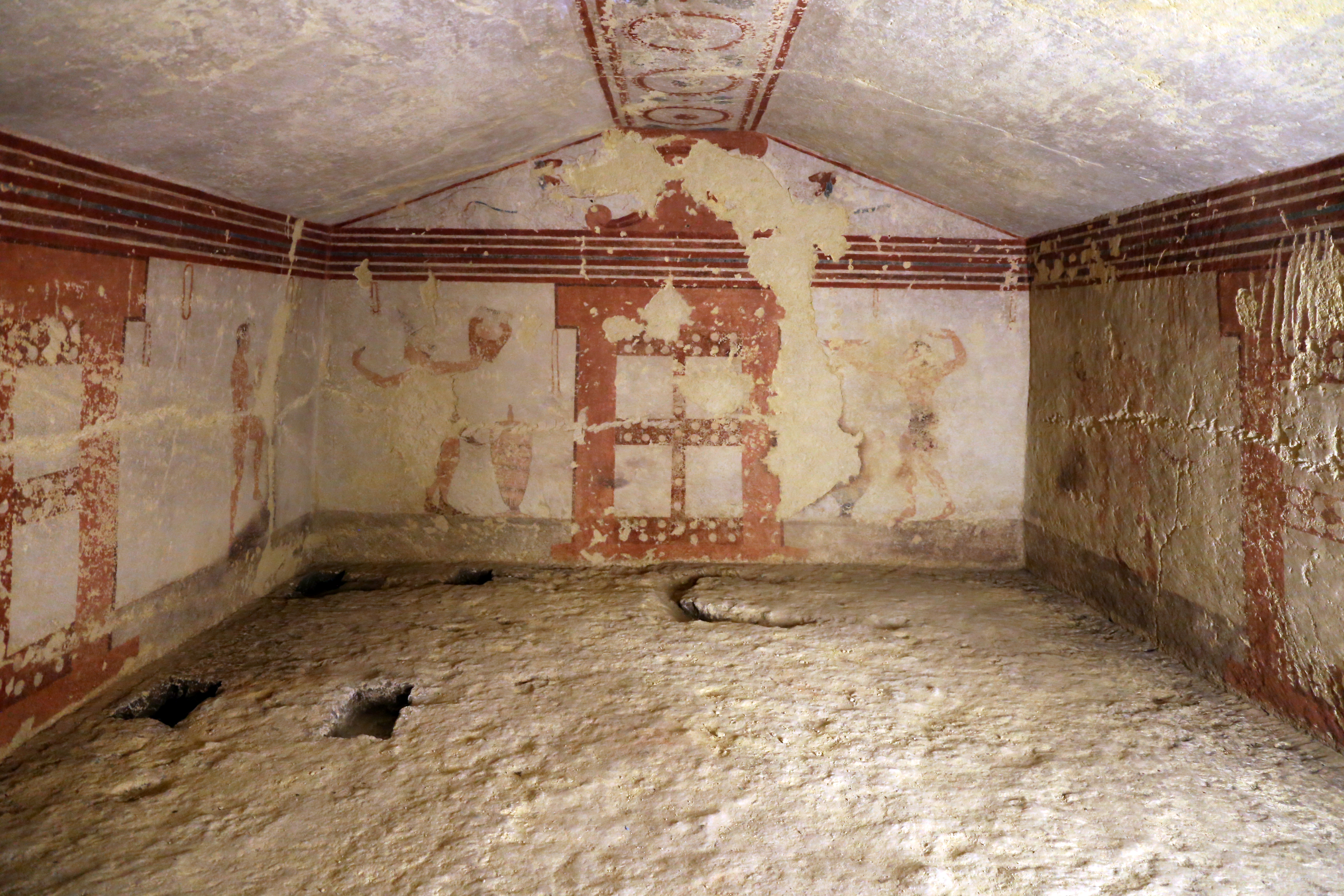
Tomb of the Whipping

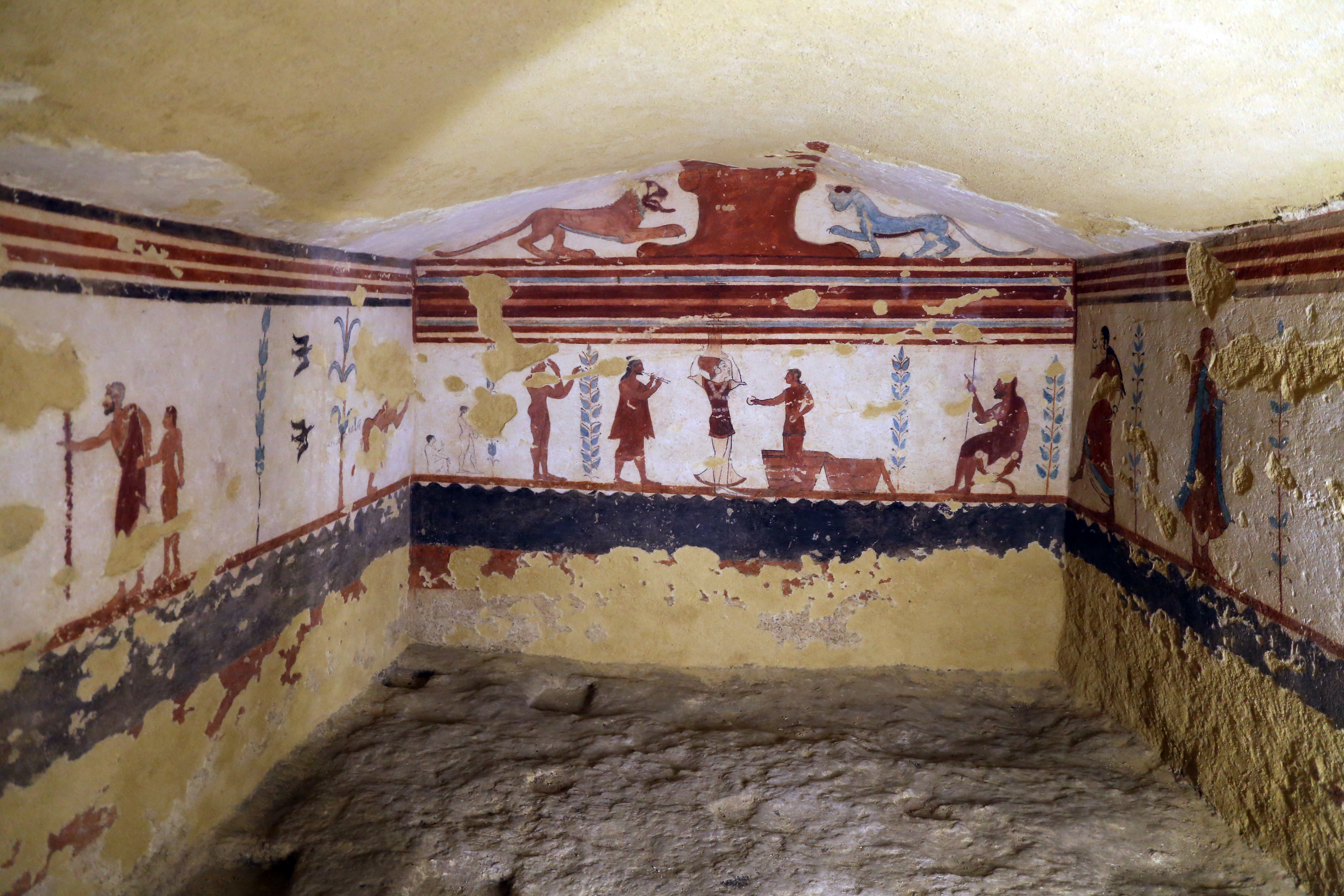
Tomb of the Jugglers

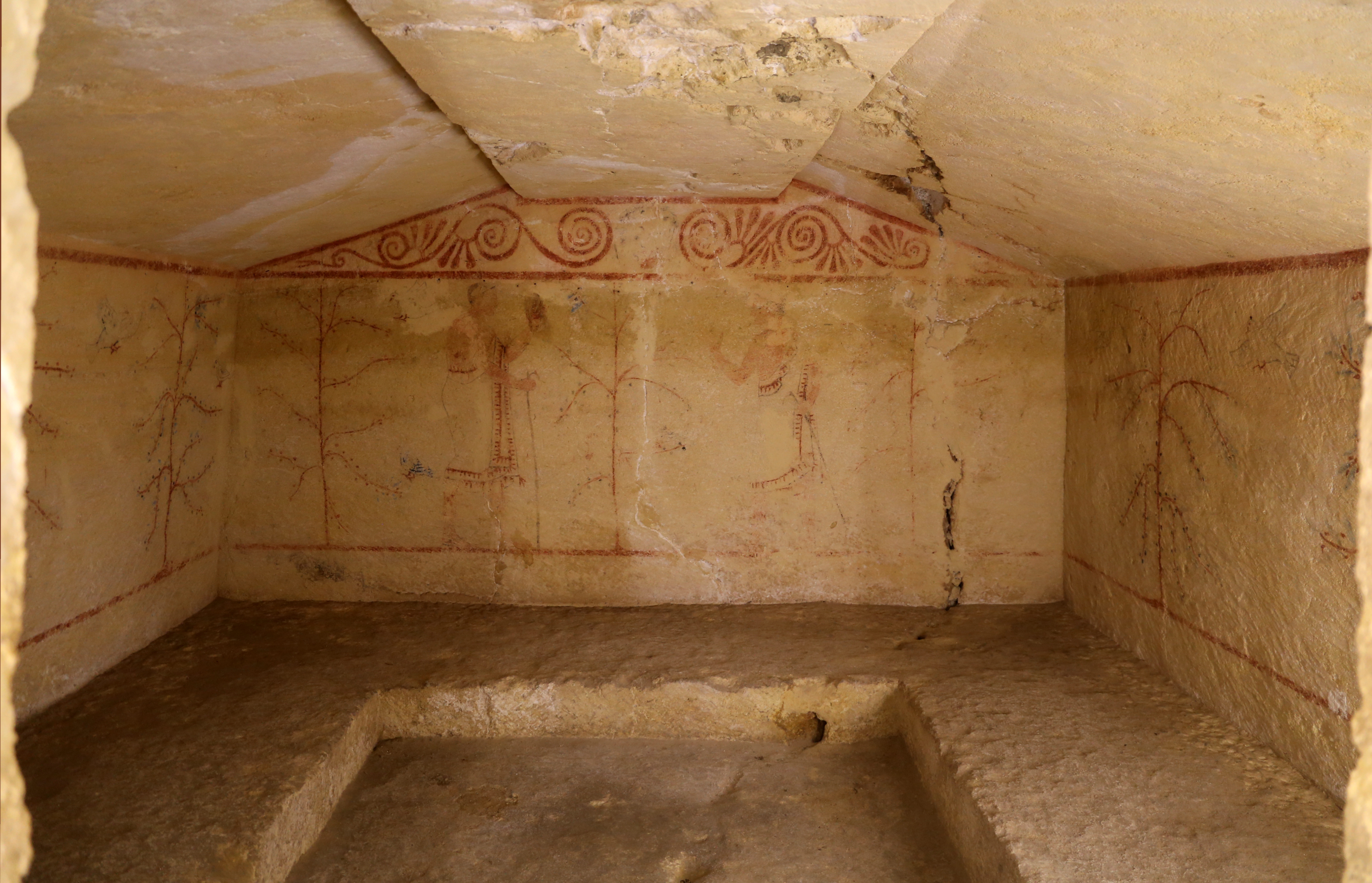
Tomb of the Gorgoneion

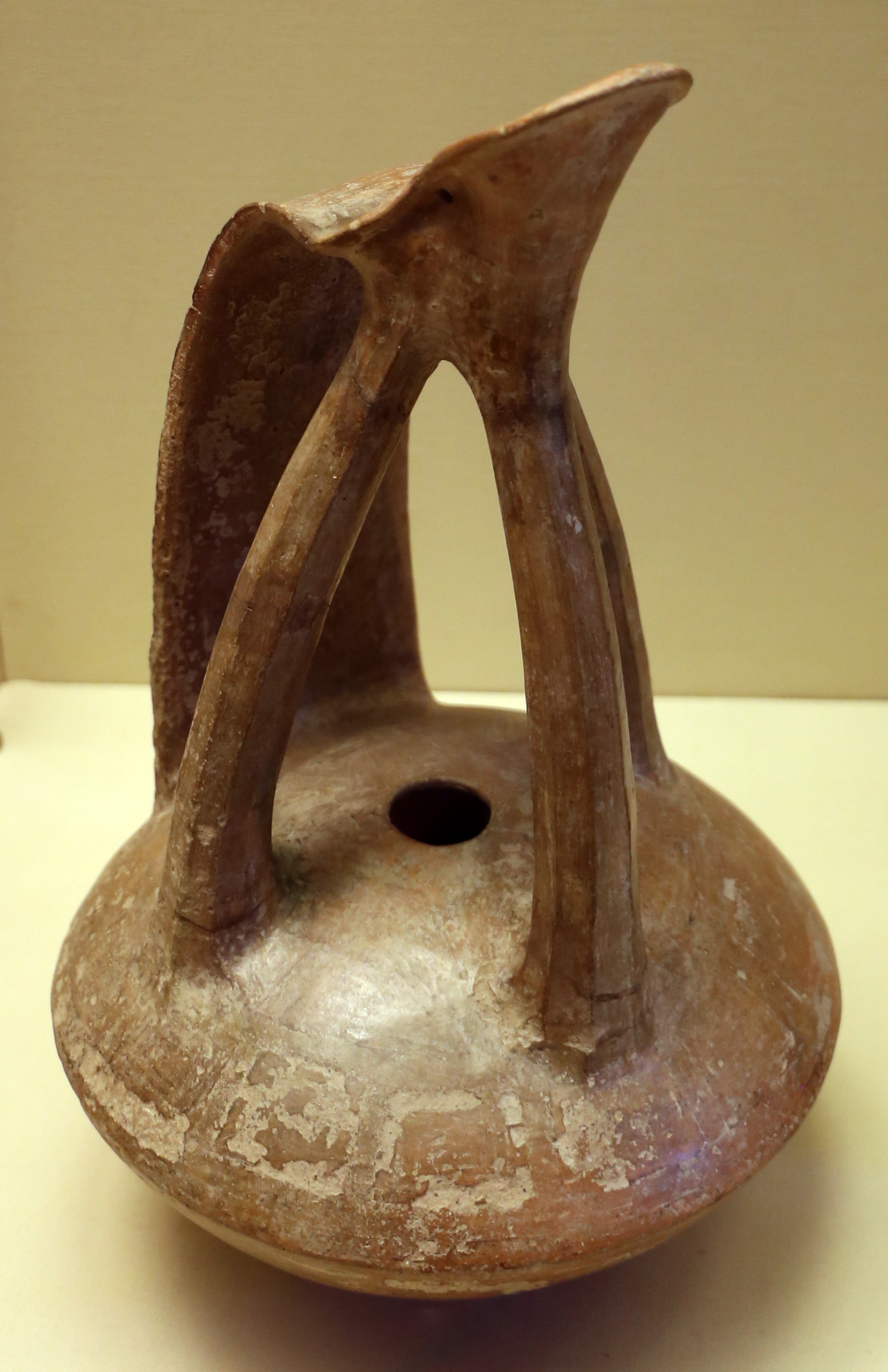
Three-necked jug from the Bocchoris tomb (Tarquinia National Museum)

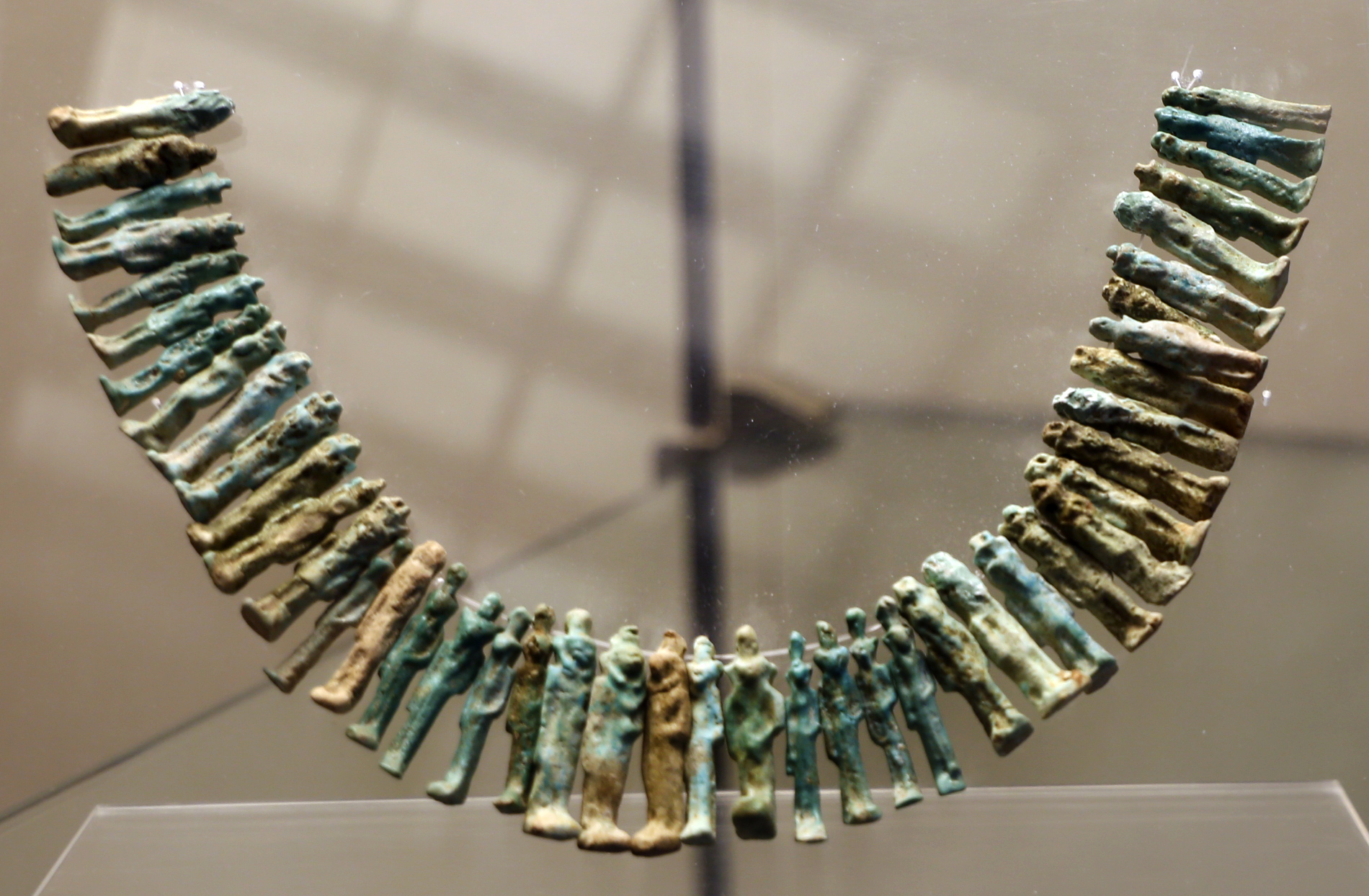
Necklace pendants with Egyptian gods (Tarquinia National Museum)

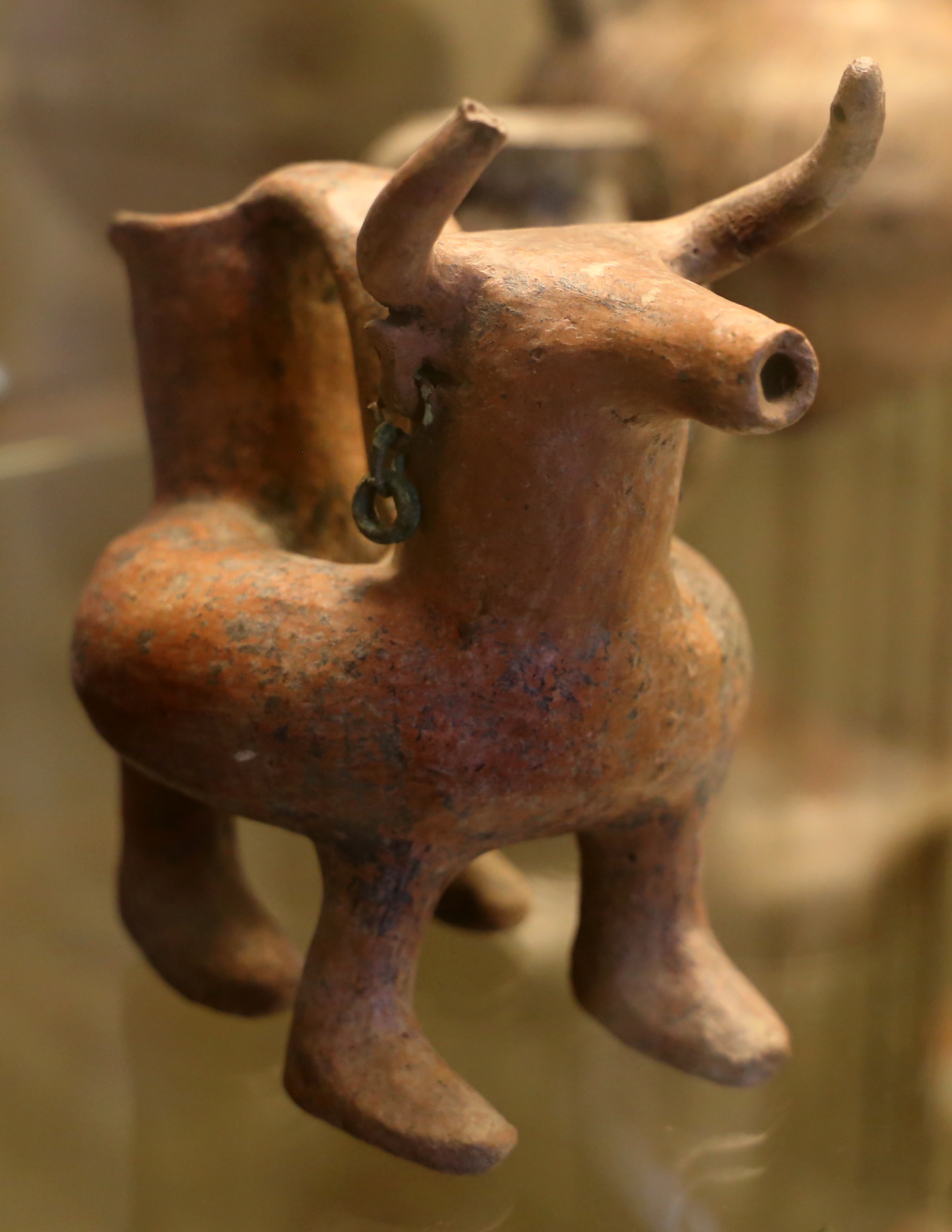
Bull-shaped oenochoe with earrings (Tarquinia National Museum)

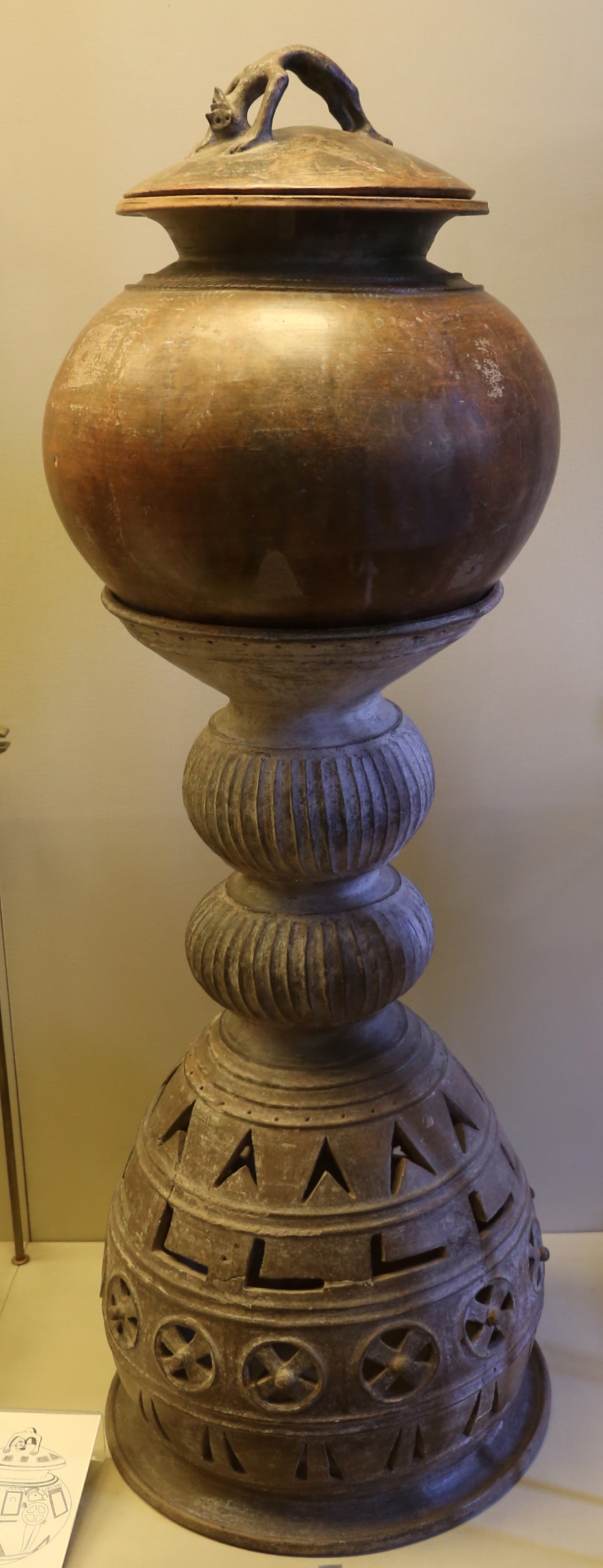
Olla on high support, with a human figure as lid handle (Tarquinia National Museum)

== See also ==
- Etruscan art
- Etruscan society
- Tarquinia National Museum
