= Teesside Steelworks =

Steel manufacturing plant in North Yorkshire, England

Coordinates: 54.5924°N 1.1352°W

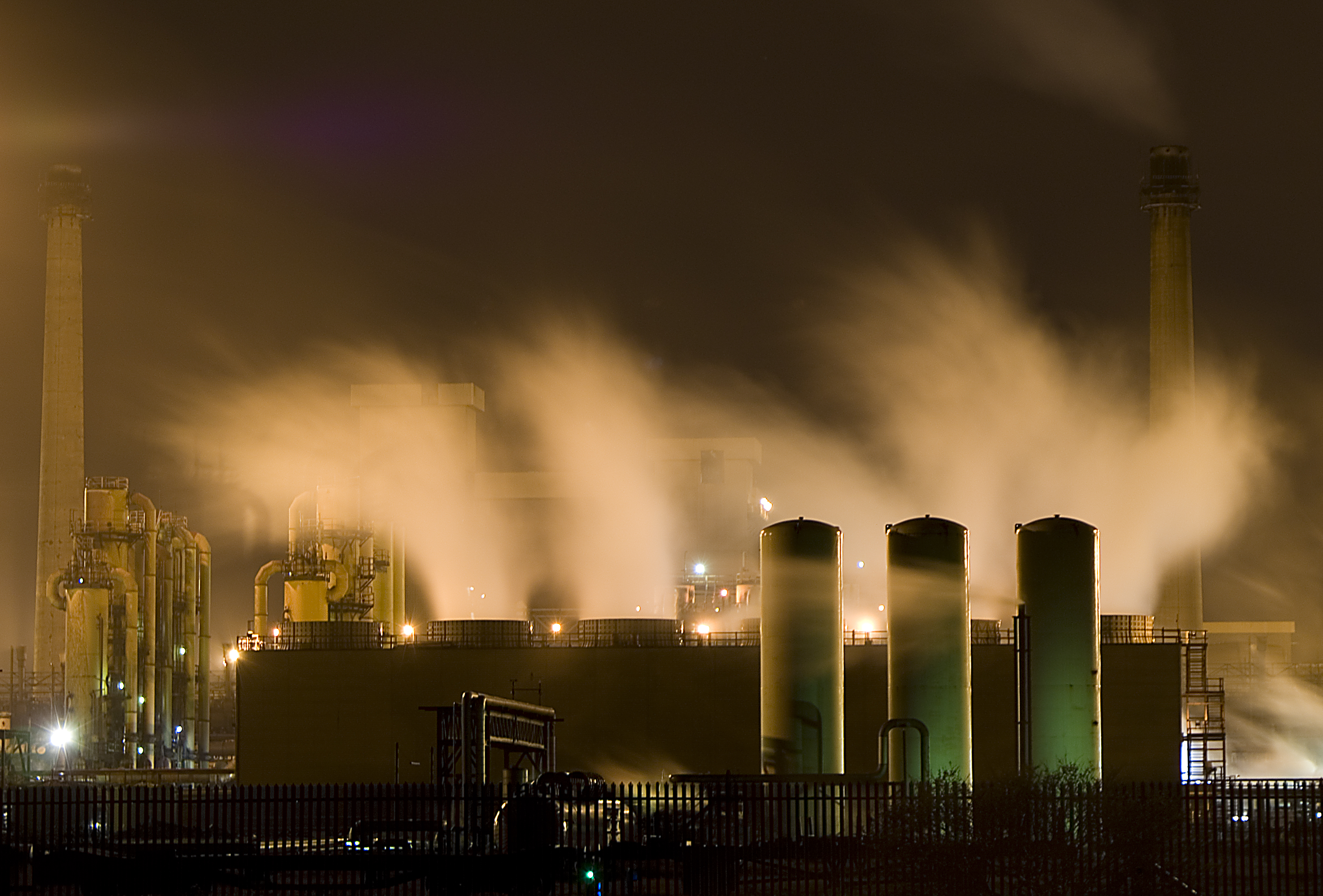
Teesside Steelworks at night, in 2009

The Teesside Steelworks was a large steelworks that formed a continuous stretch along the south bank of the River Tees from the towns of Middlesbrough to Redcar in North Yorkshire, England. At its height there were 91 blast furnaces within a 10-mile radius of the area. By the early 1990s, when No.4 furnace at Cleveland Iron closed there was only one left on Teesside. Opened in 1979 and located near the mouth of the River Tees, the Redcar blast furnace was the second largest in Europe.

The majority of the steelworks, including the Redcar blast furnace, Redcar and South Bank coke ovens and the BOS plant at Lackenby closed in 2015. The Teesside Beam Mill and some support services still operate at the Lackenby part of the site.

On 1 October 2022, the Basic Oxygen Steelmaking (BOS) Plant at Lackenby was demolished in one of the largest single explosive demolition operations in the country in 75 years.

== History ==
=== 19th century Origins ===
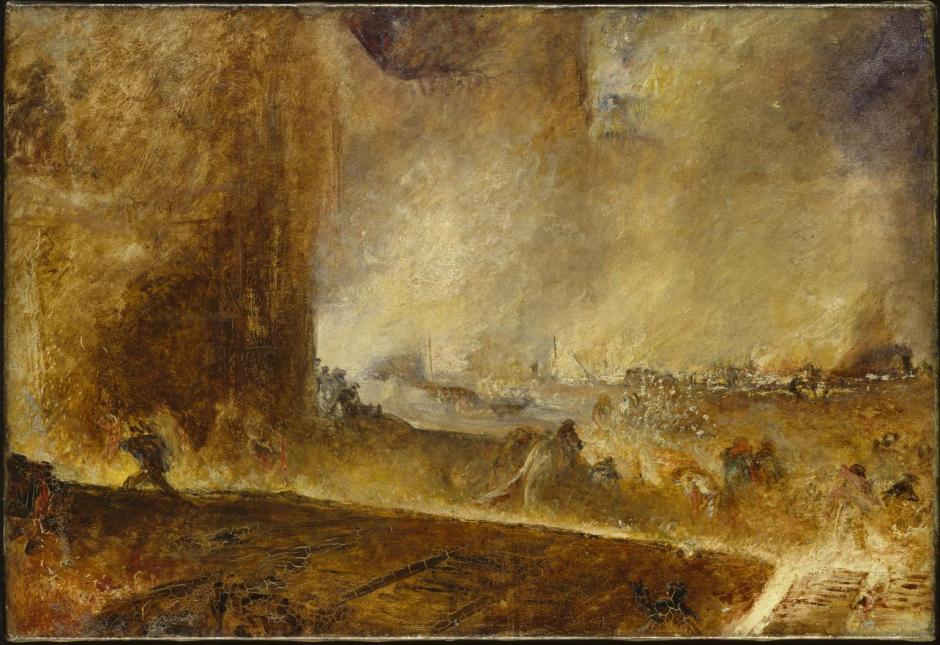
Iron Works, Middlesbrough, c. 1865–70, Alfred William Hunt

==== Bolckow, Vaughan & Co ====
In 1850s, iron ore was discovered near Eston in the Cleveland Hills of Yorkshire by John Vaughan and his mining geologist John Marley. Vaughan and his partner Henry Bolckow, over the next decades, would build an iron and steel works which extended, by 1864, over 700 acres (280 ha) along the banks of the River Tees.

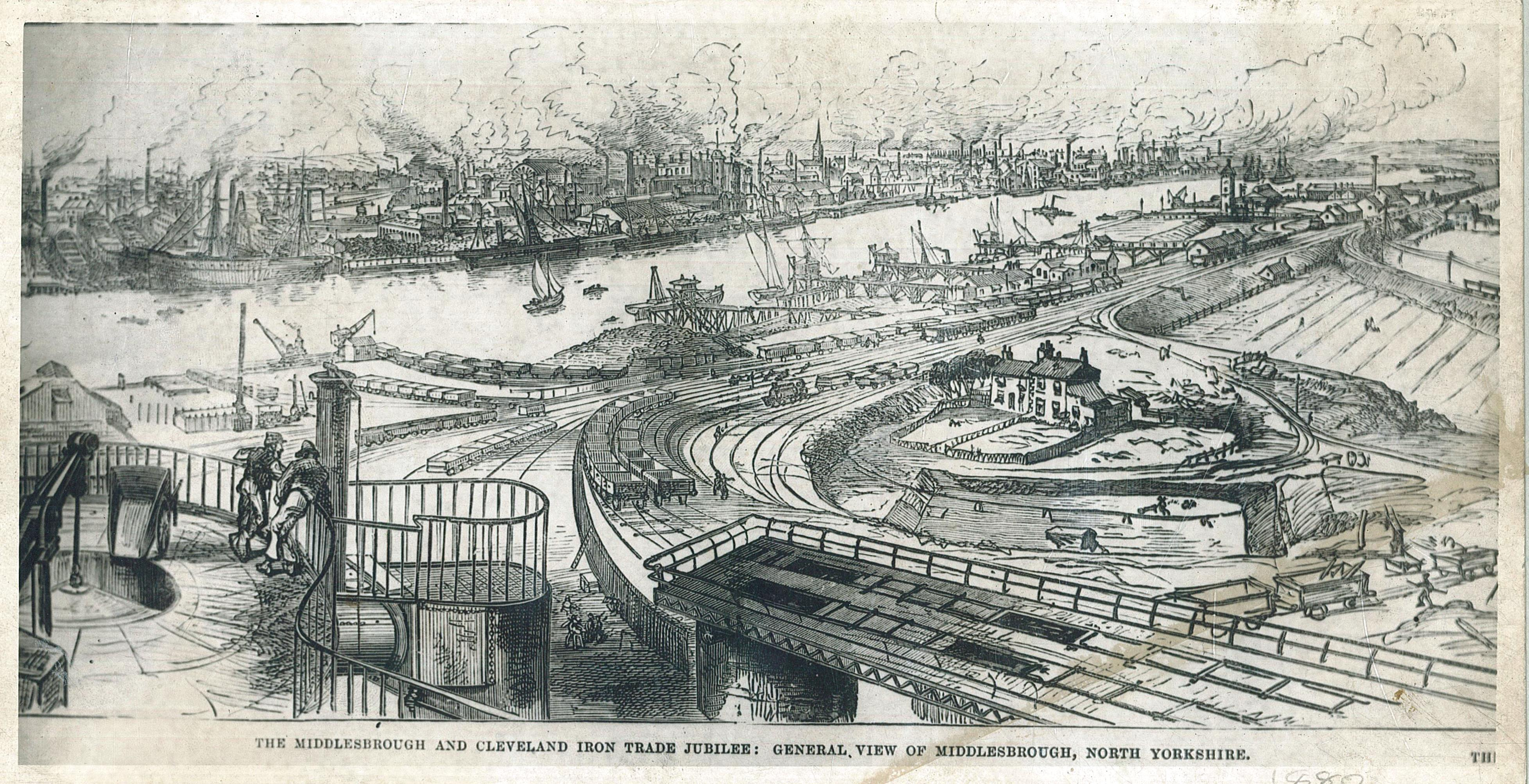
"The Middlesbrough and Cleveland Iron Trade Jubilee in 1881: general view of Middlesbrough, North Yorkshire." from The Illustrated London News, 8 October 1881

In 1875, Edward Windsor Richards became the General Manager of the Middlesbrough Ironworks. Richards was in charge of the design and construction of the new plant at Eston, the Cleveland Steel Works. It had three coke fired haematite blast furnaces. Richards' work helped to improve the Bessemer process for making steel, in the case when the ore is rich in phosphorus, and an alkaline rock (dolomite, limestone or magnesite) is used. This variant is called the Gilchrist–Thomas process after its inventor Sidney Gilchrist Thomas who persuaded Richards to adopt it.

The firm later acquired the Southbank Steelworks and again adopted the Gilchrist–Thomas process. Bolckow, Vaughan & Co Ltd were already well established producers of Iron owning many Ironworks and furnaces and were seen as the driving force behind the rapid expansion of Middlesbrough – or "Ironopolis" – becoming Great Britain's leading producer of pig iron. After the company's acquisition of the Clay Lane works at the end of the century and a shift in production from iron to steel, they became the largest producers of steel in Great Britain and possibly the world, owning 21 of the 91 blast furnaces in the Cleveland area.

==== Dorman Long ====
In 1876, Arthur Dorman entered into a partnership with Albert de Lande Long to form Dorman Long, taking over the West Marsh Ironworks in Middlesbrough. Over next 10 years Dorman Long would expand further, acquiring the Britannia Works in Middlesbrough, and building a new steel works at the Clarence works in a joint venture with Bell Brothers.

==== Other developments ====
The amount of slag coming out of the various furnaces of Teesside increased substantially and its disposal became a costly problem for works' owners. One solution, invented in the 1870s, was the Scoria brick which became a major export of the region and can still widely be seen as a road surface in the local area.

=== 20th century expansion ===
In 1902, Dorman Long would build the first integrated steelworks at Cargo Fleet. In the following year, Lowthian Bell, then aged 87, sold a majority holding of the Bell companies to the rivals Dorman Long.

During the First World War Dorman Long was one of the first non-munitions company in Britain to dedicate itself to shell production. By 1917, they had completed a new blast furnace at Redcar with a cost of £5.4 million. Some of the steel produced here, along with steel from the Brittania and Cargo Fleet steelworks, would be used to build notable structures including the Sydney Harbour Bridge, Tyne Bridge, in the 20s, and later, the Auckland Harbour Bridge.

==== Interwar period ====
In 1923, Bolckow, Vaughan & Co acquired Redpath, Brown & Co, manufacturers of structural steel.

As the 1920s went on Bolckow Vaughan found itself in an increasingly difficult financial situation. The works were reorganised, and consultation with the workforce introduced. The causes of these problems included: poor decision-making in the period from 1900–1910 which delayed the introduction of improved steelmaking technology; optimistic belief in promises of funding made by the British government during the war, leading to reliance on costly bank loans in 1918; and failure to invest in its own coal mines to provide enough for steel production. By 1929, the financial pressures, forced the company into a takeover by Dorman Long but who by this point was also struggling financially.

In 1946, The Lackenby development was built by Dorman Long between the Redcar and Cleveland Works.

==== Nationalisation ====
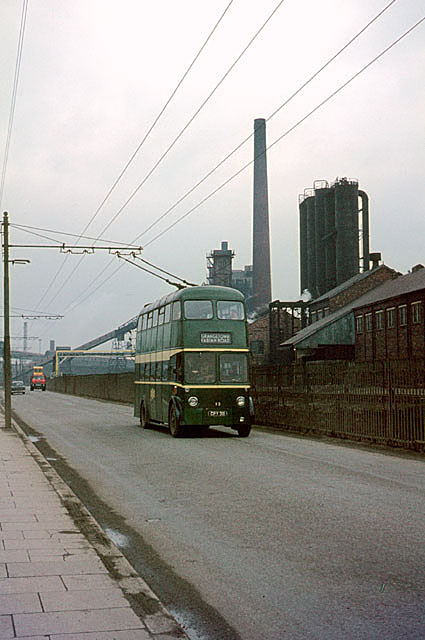
Trolleybus passing one of the coking plants which manufactured coke for the blast furnaces (1966).

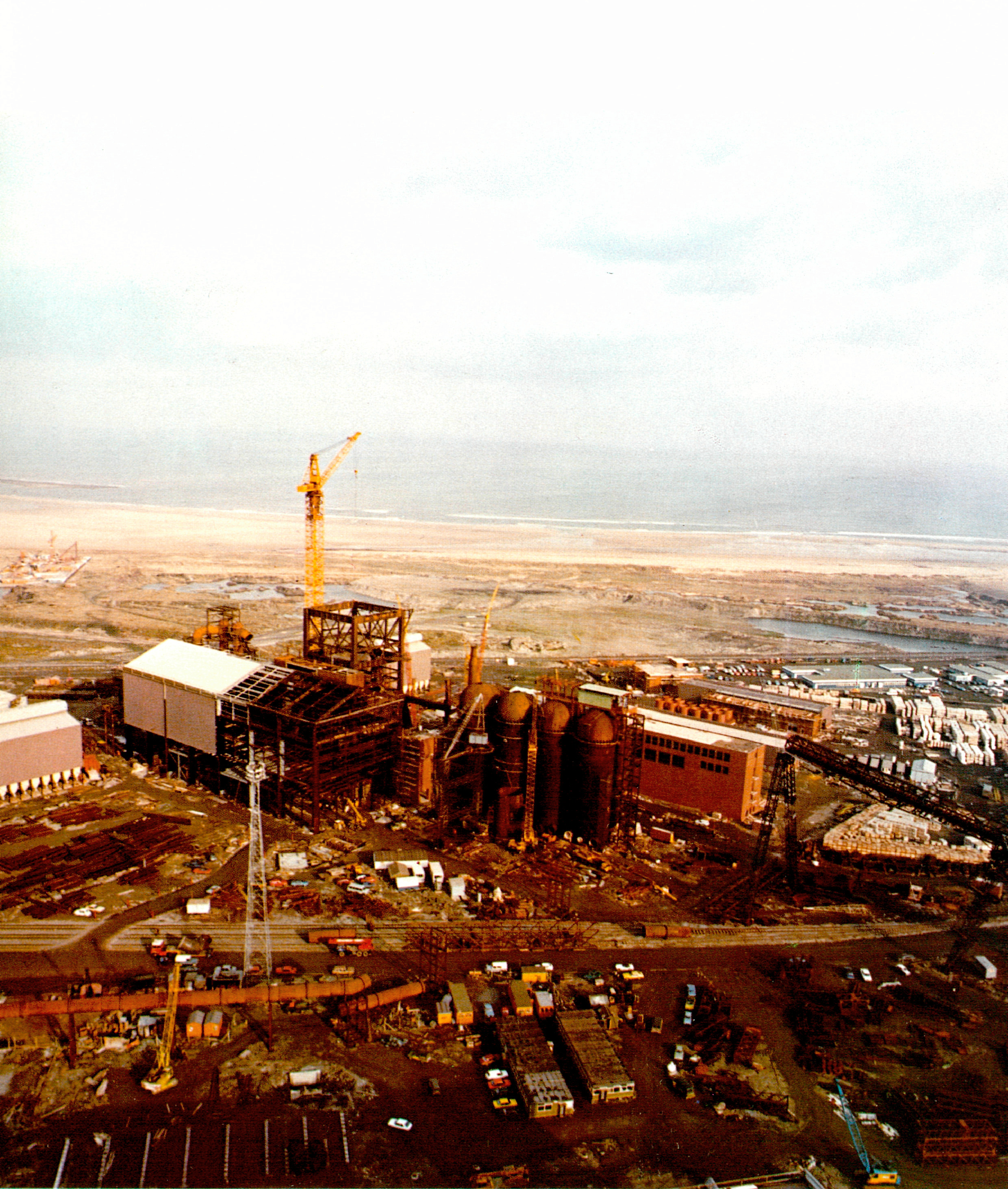
The erection of Redcar blast furnace in 1976.

In 1967, Dorman Long was absorbed into the newly created nationalised company, British Steel Corporation.

In 1979, the new blast furnace opened at the former Redcar site using the open hearth process. It was the second largest of its kind in Europe and soon became Teesside's sole remaining blast furnace.

=== Privatisation and decline ===
In 1988, British Steel was re-privatised to form British Steel plc. In 1999, British Steel plc merged with Netherlands-based steel maker Koninklijke Hoogovens to form Corus Group. Corus utilised the site for basic oxygen steelmaking, using iron produced at the company's Redcar blast furnace.

By 2003, Corus considered that the production at Teesside Cast Products (TCP) as a surplus to its needs. Corus was bought by Tata Steel in 2007.

In 2009, Corus announced partial mothballing of the Teesside blast furnace. Approximately 1,700 jobs were lost. To help the workers, the Corus Response Group was formed which developed a comprehensive package of support. This plan was in place over the 10 months after the announcement and included employment experts on site from January 2010. Support was put in place to help affected workers with individual sessions to update CVs, highlight job opportunities and look at retraining options. The response group was also worked with the Teesside Cast Products function to offer similar support.

==== SSI ====
On 24 February 2011, the steelworks was purchased by Thai-based Sahaviriya Steel Industries (SSI) for $469 million. The acquisition was expected to create more than 800 jobs on top of the existing workforce of 700 and the plant was officially reopened 15 April 2012.

On 18 September 2015, production was paused due to the global decline in steel prices.

On 28 September 2015, the plant was mothballed again amid poor steel trading conditions across the world and a drop in steel prices.

On 2 October, SSI UK entered into liquidation.

On 12 October 2015, the receiver announced there was no realistic prospect of finding a buyer. The coke ovens were scheduled for extinguishing, however this time it was done without the complex decommissioning processes conducted in 2010, which would have allowed the facility to reopen in the future.

==== British Steel ====
The remainder of the site was kept operational (Teesside Beam Mill and ancillary support services at Lackenby, and the deep-water bulk handling terminal), having been sold by Tata Steel to investment firm Greybull Capital on 1 June 2016. As part of the deal, the historic British Steel name was resurrected. The new company included the UK sites at Skinningrove and Scunthorpe as well as the Hayange rail plant in northern France.

==== Insolvency of British Steel ====
In May 2019 British Steel collapsed and was taken over by the Insolvency Service. It was later purchased in March 2020 by Jingye Group, who agreed to save the remaining jobs by modernising the steelworks.

===== Electric Arc Furnace plans =====
In April 2024, British Steel won planning permission for an electric arc furnace to be built at the remaining Lackenby site. In March 2025 British Steel announced that the plans had been abandoned.

== Demolition and Redevelopment ==
The steelworks' BOS plant, blast furnace, and power station, along with auxiliary structures, were demolished between October 2022 and June 2023, creating a 4,500-acre brownfield site.

The site is being regenerated as Teesworks, one of multiple sites included in the Teesside Freeport project.

== Transport ==
The site is situated alongside the A66 and A1085 dual carriageways. Main access is via the Lackenby and Redcar entrances, situated on the A1085.

The site is adjacent to Teesport that was used for iron ore, coal, and other raw material imports, and steel exports.

The site was served by the Redcar British Steel railway station, which opened on 19 June 1978. Northern discontinued service to the station in December 2019, prior to this the station (owned by Network Rail), was surrounded by private land, which prevented any public access to or from the station.

== See also ==
- Billingham Manufacturing Plant
- Bowesfield Works
- Darlington TMD
- Darlington Works
- Hopetown Carriage Works
