= Sogerail =

Coordinates: 49.336326°N 6.050626°E

- Formerly: Sogerail (1994); Corus France SA (1999); Tata Steel France Rail SA (2006)
- Company type: Subsidiary
- Industry: Steel industry
- Founded: 1892; 133 years ago
- Founder: De Wendel family
- Headquarters: Hayange, France
- Area served: France and rest of Europe
- Products: Railway rails

Sogerail (later Corus France SA, 1999; Tata Steel France Rail, 2006) is a French rail manufacturer near Hayange, in the Lorraine region of France. Since the 19th century, its products have been used by various railways across Europe as well as various overseas customers.

Iron production at Hayange was established by the De Wendel family as the Usine Saint Jacques (Sait Jacques factory) circa 1892 and rail manufacturing has taken place since 1897. During both World Wars, the plant was under German administration. As many as 2,460 employees have staffed the site at a time. During the late 20th century, the Hayange works became a part of the French steel maker Usinor-Sacilor's long products division. By the late 1990s, the works' products were being sold across Western Europe as well as both North and South America. During 1999, the business was acquired by Corus Group plc, thus becoming British owned for the first time.

During 2006, Corus, and thus the Hayange works, became a part of Tata Steel Europe. In April 2016, the company (and other long products businesses in Tata Steel Europe) were acquired by Greybull Capital. In August 2020, the British-based company Liberty Steel acquired the Hayange plant; one year later, it was again sold to Germany's SHS Group and renamed to Saarstahl Rail. The business is publicly regarded by the French government to be a strategic national asset. By 2023, it was reportedly the only manufacturer in Europe producing rails from electric arc furnaces.

== History ==
The iron industry at the Sogerail site in Nilvange/Knutange near Hayange (Moselle department, Lorraine, France) dates to circa 1892 with the establishment of the Usine Saint Jacques by the de Wendels. On 2 January 1897, the plant rolled its first rail; the activity has been a core activity of the Hayange works ever since.

Throughout the First World War, the plant was placed under German administration from 1914 until 1918. During 1926, the Hayange rail mills reportedly employed around 2,460 people and produced 81,000 tonnes of rail. Between 1941 and 1945, the works was again under German administration; following the end of the Second World War, the de Wendel family took over ownership of the factory. In 1964, the steelworker Raymond Satnbach patented the universal rail rolling system following its development in St Jacques.

During the late 20th century, the Hayange works became part of the French steel maker Usinor-Sacilor, forming a key part of its long products division in the Sollac subsidiary. Under Usinor-Sacilor, steel was supplied to the plant from the nearby Florange steelworks; prior to this, it had been sourced from the Unimétal plant in Gandrange (sold to Ispat). During the 1990s, Usinor-Sacilor sought to divest its long products division. By this point, the division had built up a market presence in France, Western Europe, and both North and South America.

In 1999, Sogerail, which then employed around 500 personnel, by British Steel Corporation (BSC) for £83 million. The transaction doubled the size of BSC's rail business, making it the largest manufacturer of rail track in Europe. The supply of steel from Sollac continued until BSC began to supply Sogerail with unfinished steel from its Scunthorpe plant. Following the acquisition, Sogerail (which was later rebranded as British Steel France Rail) worked alongside BSC's pre-existing rail manufacturing site in Workington, Cumbria, UK; the latter could not produce rails as long as Sogerail's without further investment.

During 2005, BSC's successor Corus Group plc restructured its rail manufacturing operations. This involved the closure of its Workington site and the establishment of rail manufacturing at the Scunthorpe steelworks. In 2006, Tata Steel acquired Corus forming Tata Steel Europe and the Hayange plant became Tata Steel France Rail SA. In April 2016, the long products division of Tata Steel Europe, including the Hayange plant, was sold to Greybull Capital for a nominal amount.

By late 2016, Hayange works was capable of producing 350,000 tonnes of rail per year, the lengths of which spanned up to 108m. During the late 2010s, amid rumours of job cuts being planned, the French government issued a declaration that the Hayange works was considered to be a strategic national asset.

In August 2020, the British-based company Liberty Steel acquired the Hayange plant; a prior acquisition attempt by the Chinese company Jingye Group had been blocked by the French government. During the following year, the Hayange plant was sold to Germany's SHS Group, which rebranded the operation as Saarstahl Rail.

By 2023, the company was reportedly the only manufacturer in Europe that was producing rails from so-called "green steel"; that is steel made using electric arc furnaces. In the aftermath of the Russian invasion of Ukraine, Saarstahl Rail started supplying rails to Ukrainian Railways under an arrangement with the French government.
