= GEC Stephenson locomotive =

GEC Stephenson
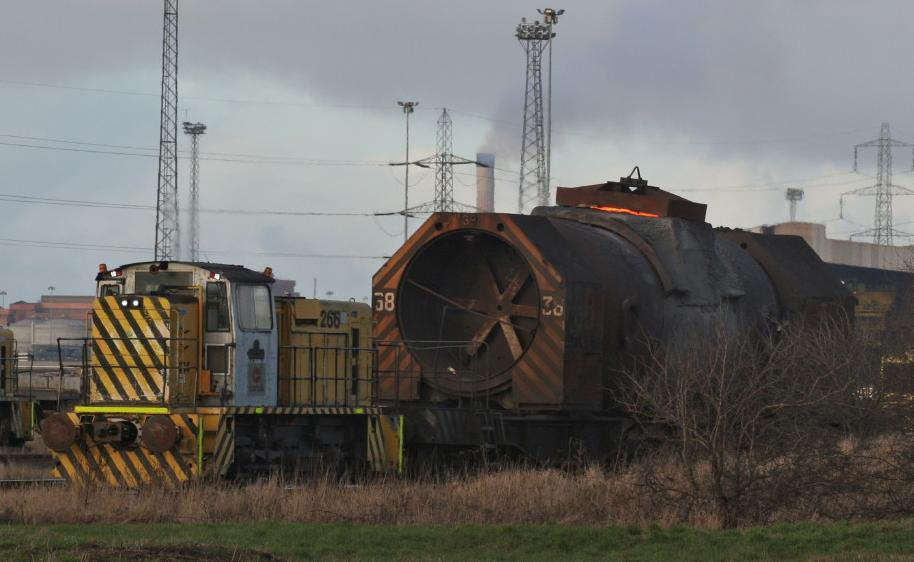
- GEC Stephenson locomotives and torpedo wagon at Corus Lackenby (Redcar), 2010
Type and origin
- Power type: Diesel
- Builder: GEC Traction / Vulcan Foundry
- Build date: 1976-1980
- Total produced: ~30
Specifications
- Gauge: 1,435 mm (4 ft 8 1/2 in)
- Loco weight: 36 to 100 t BSC : 75 ton NCB : 75 or 50 ton
- Transmission: Diesel-electric
Performance figures
- Power output: engine: 425 to 1,500 horsepower (317 to 1,119 kW); BSC : 750 hp (Note: The British Steel vehicles are described as having either 650 hp, or 750 hp rated engines.); NCB : 500 hp

The GEC Stephenson locomotives are a type of heavy industrial shunter built in the 1970s by British industrial company GEC Traction. The locomotives were used for heavy shunting tasks in UK industrial sites for clients including British Steel Corporation and the National Coal Board.

== History and design ==
The locomotives were available in 3- or 4-axle versions in the same frame, with a range of masses and engine powers, each axle was powered and the locomotives could be operated in multiple from a single cab.

Most of the locomotives produced were 3 axle versions of two types - a 50-ton loco (16.5 ton axleload) with a 500 hp V8 cylinder Dorman 8QT engine, and a 75-ton (25 ton axleload) machine with a 12-cylinder engine rated at 750 hp. The NCB acquired both locomotive types.

British Steel acquired the heavier 75 ton model; twenty five 750 hp locomotives were acquired by BSC Redcar primarily for hauling torpedo wagons.

An ex-Barrington Cement Works ex-ICI locomotive named Ludwig Mond was acquired in 2010 by the Rutland Railway Museum.

As of 2012 locomotives of this type are still in service with Tata Steel Europe in the UK. In January 2012 the steel works in Lackenby imported ten 1500 kW ex-NSB Di8 Bo'Bo' locomotives for the torpedo wagon trains - this will result in several of the GEC locomotives being scrapped though some are expected to be retained for track renewal and shunting work.
