= British Steel (2016–present) =

British steel manufacturer

British Steel Limited
- Formerly: Jingye Steel (UK) Limited (2019–2020)
- Industry: Steel
- Founded: 2016
- Headquarters: Scunthorpe, England
- Key people: Allan Bell (Interim CEO)
- Products: Long steel products
- Number of employees: 4,052 permanent staff (January 2026)
- Parent: Greybull Capital (2016–2020); Jingye Group (2020–2026); Government of the United Kingdom (2026–present)
- Website: britishsteel.co.uk

British Steel Limited is a British long steel products manufacturer that is the only source of primary steelmaking in the country.

The company was formed in 2016 after Greybull Capital acquired the long products division of Tata Steel Europe. Jingye Group acquired the company in 2020 following a period of insolvency, prior to its nationalisation in 2026 by the Starmer government to preserve the capacity for primary steelmaking.

The company's main production site is Scunthorpe Steelworks alongside other integrated operational sites.

== History ==
=== Formation and Greybull ownership ===
During the 2010s, weak European steel demand following the 2008 financial crisis, together with high debt levels, led Tata Steel Europe to seek a buyer for its long products division. Talks with the Klesch Group ended unsuccessfully in 2015 amid concerns over energy prices and steel imports.

In April 2016, Tata agreed to sell the business to Greybull Capital for a nominal £1, with Greybull assuming the division's assets and liabilities. The business was subsequently renamed British Steel. At the time of the takeover, the company employed around 5,000 workers, primarily in the UK.

Following restructuring measures, including new labour agreements, British Steel returned to profitability in 2016–17, reporting a pre-tax profit of £47 million after a £79 million loss the previous year.

=== Insolvency and Jingye Group acquisition ===
In May 2019, British Steel entered insolvency following failed rescue talks between the UK government and Greybull Capital, placing around 5,000 jobs at risk. EY was appointed special manager while efforts were made to find a buyer.

In November 2019, Jingye Group agreed to acquire British Steel for £70 million, with the takeover completed in March 2020.

Jingye stated that it invested more than £1.2 billion into British Steel after the acquisition to maintain operations amid difficult market conditions, tariffs and rising environmental costs. The company said the Scunthorpe site was losing around £700,000 per day by 2025.

=== Government intervention ===
Between 2022 and 2025, Jingye and the UK government held discussions on transitioning Scunthorpe from blast furnace production to electric arc furnaces, but no agreement was reached. In April 2025, the UK government introduced emergency legislation allowing it to take operational control of British Steel's Scunthorpe plant after negotiations with Jingye over a transition to electric arc furnace production collapsed.

Government intervention, led by the Department for Business and Trade (DBT), was intended to prevent the closure of the UK’s last remaining blast furnaces, avoiding major job losses and disruption to strategic supply chains. However, the National Audit Office (NAO) found that DBT had already spent £377 million between 12 April 2025 and 31 January 2026 to keep the Scunthorpe site operational, with these funds classified as a loan. The NAO also noted that ongoing operations were costing around £1.3 million per day, with no fixed budget, repayment schedule, or end date for government support.

=== Nationalisation ===
On 11 May 2026, Prime Minister Keir Starmer announced legislation that would allow the government to bring British Steel into public ownership. The nationalisation took effect on 16 July 2026.

== Operations ==
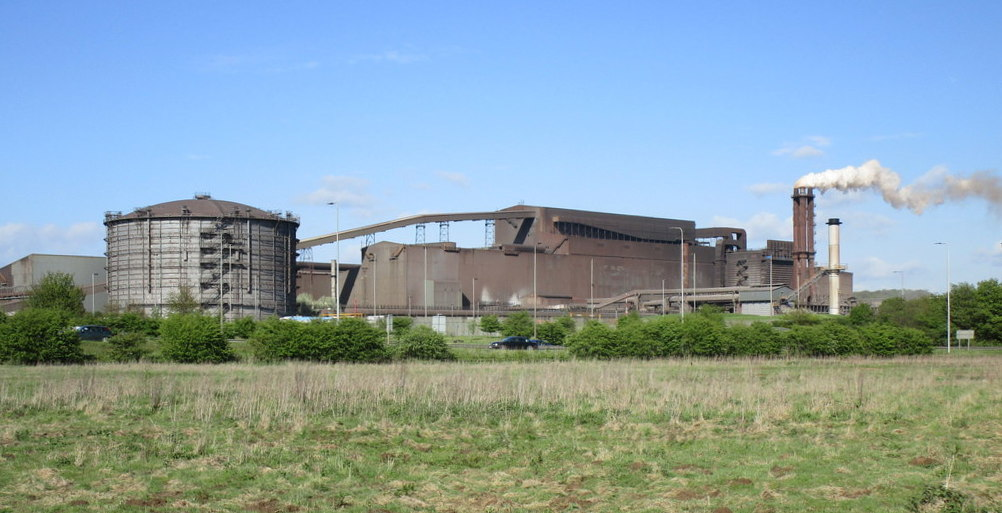
Scunthorpe Works BOS plant

British Steel's operations have included:

- Scunthorpe Steelworks – primary steelmaking, rail, rod and section production
- Teesside Steelworks (Teesside Beam Mill) – heavy sections
- Skinningrove Steelworks – special sections and crane rail
- Hayange rail mill in France
- Engineering workshop in Workington
