= Teesside Beam Mill =

Steelworks in North Yorkshire, England

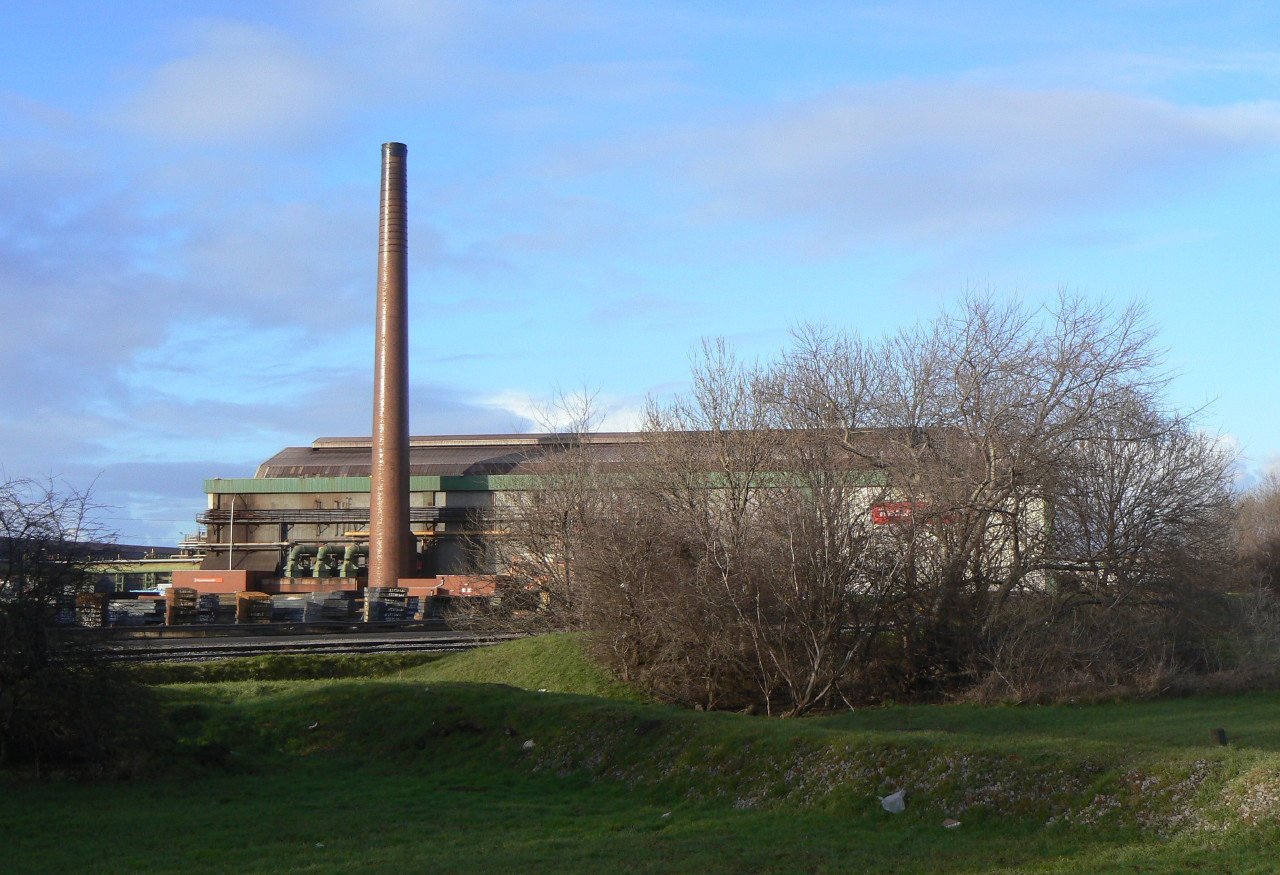
- Teesside Beam Mill
- Built: 1954–1958
- Location: Lackenby, North Yorkshire, England
- Coordinates: 54.588°N 1.135°W
- Industry: Steel
- Products: I-Beams
- Employees: 400 (2023)
- Volume: 750,000 tonnes (830,000 tons) (2006)
- Owner: British Steel

Teesside Beam Mill (TBM) is a steel reheating and rolling plant located at Lackenby, on Teesside, North Yorkshire, England. The plant was set up in the 1950s by the Dorman Long company and began full production in 1958, making beams for building projects. The plant produces around 750,000 tonnes (830,000 tons) of steel products per year, and is the United Kingdom's only producer of large steel sections for the building industry.

== History ==
The Teesside Beam Mill (Note: The beam mill is a downstream process plant; raw steel used to be carried to an adjacent plant on an internal railway from Redcar Steel making plant, which was a smelter, or primary steelworks. This was then taken to the TBM as ingots to be rolled into beams.) was developed after the Second World War, on a strip of land at Lackenby, sandwiched between the Middlesbrough to Redcar railway line to the north, and the A1085 trunk road to the south. The narrow land measured 680 acres (280 ha) across, providing some 2,215 acres (896 ha) in total, with the buildings arranged diagonally between the two transport modes so as maximise land space. Groundwork for the beam plant was started by Dorman Long in 1954, with the mill being built from 1955 onwards. The mill was completed in 1958, with an eventual cost of £18 million. It was built adjacent to the Lackenby steel plant to enable steel ingots to be shipped in to the facility from the open-hearth plant next door, and was opened by Alexander Fleck who was chairman of ICI (ICI had a new plant under construction at nearby Wilton).

Originally the plant rolled steel for the bridge building industry, but later the plant specialised in beams for the construction industry. Its first project was to supply steel beams of 75 feet (23 m) length for the Catterick Bypass of the A1 road in North Yorkshire, in 1958. Another of its earlier projects was to supply high-tensile beams between 45 feet (14 m) and 60 feet (18 m) long for the Gladesville Bridge over the Parramatta River in New South Wales (just upstream from Sydney Harbour Bridge). It was the first time that beams of that length had been rolled in that type of steel. By the 21st century, the beam mill was the only plant in the United Kingdom capable of producing large steel sections for the building and construction industry.

The merger of British Steel and Hoogovens to form Corus was completed by 1999, and in the first year of operation, the Teesside Cast Products (TCP) business lost money, so a restructuring programme was initiated, but this did not include the TBM, and management of the mill was aligned away from TCP under the Scunthorpe operations. By the early 2000s, the plant was taking semi-finished steel from either the Teesside or Scunthorpe Steelworks, heating it at a temperature of 1,300 °C (2,370 °F), to make I-beams (girders) for the construction industry. Ingots ranging in weight from 5.6–21.3 tonnes (6.2–23.5 tons) are brought to temperature and rolled in a primary mill, these are then sent to a roughing and finishing mill, before being hot sawn to the customers required length, and then cooled. Since the closure of the adjacent Teesside Steelworks at Redcar, the Scunthorpe plant some 120 kilometres (75 mi) to the south has sent semi-finished steel to TBM via train, though some slab deliveries from Scunthorpe had started in the early 2000s. (Note: The steelworks at Redcar ceased producing steel for Corus in 2007. This plant was the primary source for raw steel for the TBM. When SSI re-lit the furnaces at Redcar to restart the steelmaking process in April 2012, their products were destined for elsewhere. Corus, later Tata, then British Steel, supplied the TBM from their plant at Scunthorpe.)

The plant produced 1,000,000 tonnes (1,100,000 tons) of girders in 1960, 520,000 tonnes (570,000 tons) in 1969 and 1977, 600,000 tonnes (660,000 tons) in 1989, and 750,000 tonnes (830,000 tons) in 2006. In 2023 the plant had around 400 people working there. A new reheat furnace was built at the plant between 1984 and 1985, costing £17 million (equivalent to £52,653,000 in 2025), and the whole plant was modernised in the late 1980s at a cost of £69 million (equivalent to £182,572,000 in 2025), and a new high technology mill was completed in the summer of 1991. The new process in the mill reduced lead-in time for the creation of new beams from 18 hours to three hours.

=== Notable uses of TBM steel ===
- Canary Wharf (London)
- Catterick Bypass (A1 road)
- Gladesville Bridge
- Heathrow Terminal 5
- London Stadium
- The Scalpel, a skyscraper in London
- The Shard
- World Trade Center

== Owners ==
- Dorman Long 1958–1967
- British Steel 1967–1999 (British Steel was privatised in 1988)
- Corus 1999–2007
- Tata Steel Europe 2007–2016
- British Steel (Greybull Capital) 2016–2019
- British Steel (Jingye) 2019–

== Future ==
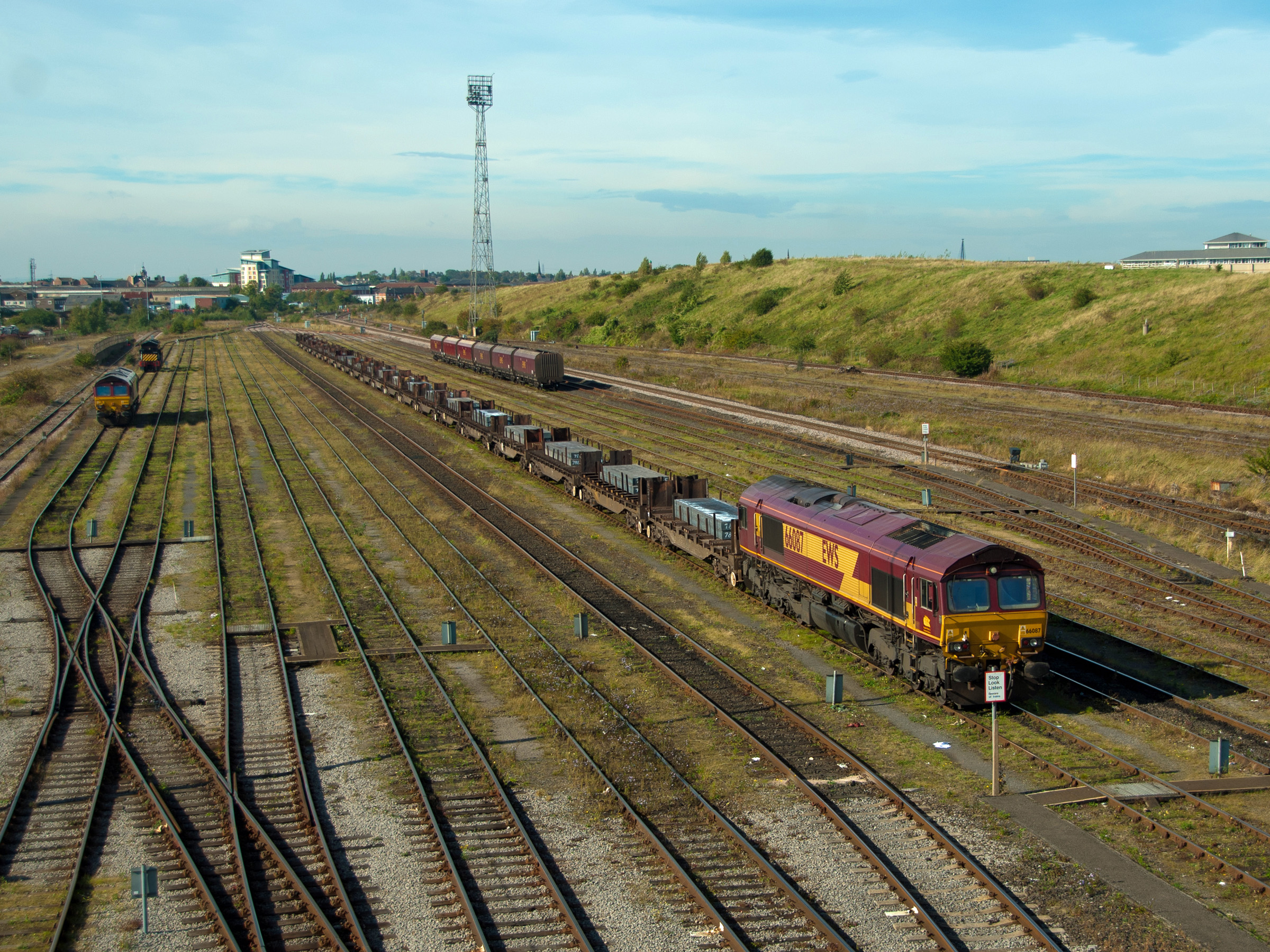
Steel from Scunthorpe in Tees Yard

British Steel have put forward a proposal to take green hydrogen to power the plant instead of natural gas. This is projected to commence in 2024, with the hydrogen being produced nearby on Teesside. The TBM plant requires an energy consumption of 1.8 gigajoules (500 kWh) per 1-tonne (1.1-ton) of steel rolled, which needs 45.6 cubic metres (1,610 cu ft) of natural gas, releasing 2.02 kilograms (4.5 lb) of carbon into the atomosphere.

The owners of the Teesside Beam Mill, British Steel, announced in November 2023 their intention to stop making primary steel using the basic oxygen process at their Scunthorpe plant, and instead to utilise two Electric arc furnaces (EAF) to produce semi-finished steel from scrap metal. One of these EAF plants would be built adjacent to Teesside Beam Mill and would be used to supply the feedstock metal for the TBM and another British Steel plant at Skinningrove. This would mean the closure of the Scunthorpe plant with the loss of 2,000 jobs, and the cessation of semi-finished steel from Lincolnshire through to Teesside on freight trains, as the primary metal for the beam mill would be sourced from the adjacent plant EAF located nearby. In April 2024, the EAF plant was given the go-ahead, with a view to being operational in 2025. The EAF plant is slated to be 210 feet (64 m) tall, and cover an area of 370,000 square feet (34,000 m^{2}).
