= Skinningrove Steelworks =

Mill in North Yorkshire, England

Coordinates: 54.566483°N 0.906564°W

Skinningrove Iron Company
- Predecessor: Loftus Iron Company (1874–77)
- Founded: 1880
- Fate: Absorbed into British Steel Corporation (1968)

Skinningrove steelworks is a steel mill in Skinningrove, North Yorkshire, England. The business was formed in 1874 as the Loftus Iron Company, but this was liquidated and a new company, the Skinningrove Iron Company, was formed in 1880. In the early 20th century the works expanded from producing only pig iron to include steel production, with mills specialising in long products including railway rail. As part of the business the company constructed a jetty at Skinningrove, and owned an ironstone mine in Loftus.

The works existed as a separate entity under the overall ownership of Pease and Partners bank until nationalisation into the Iron and Steel Corporation of Great Britain in 1951, returned to private ownership in 1963, and renationalised into British Steel Corporation (BSC) in 1967. Under BSC, the works was rationalised with all primary steel production ended by the early 1970, with the works supplied by a larger steel plant at Lackenby near Redcar. The plant became focused on the production of special sections.

Ownership as part of BSC passed to Corus Group plc (1999), and to Tata Steel Europe (2006). In 2016, the long products division of Tata Steel Europe including Skinningrove was sold to Greybull Capital.

== History ==
The Loftus Iron Company was established c. 1873/74 at Skinningrove on the north-east coast of England between Redcar and Whitby. Initially two blast furnaces were built, approximately 1 mile from ironstone workings.

In 1877, the business was liquidated, and was acquired by the Skinningrove Iron Company in 1880. Thomas Charles Hutchinson became manager of the company in 1880. Under Hutchinson a jetty at Skinningrove was re-established – hydraulic cement manufactured using the blast furnace's slag was used in the jetty's construction.

In 1894, the works was upgraded and a business relationship formed with Pease and Partners. (Pease and Partners bank founded by Joseph Pease.)

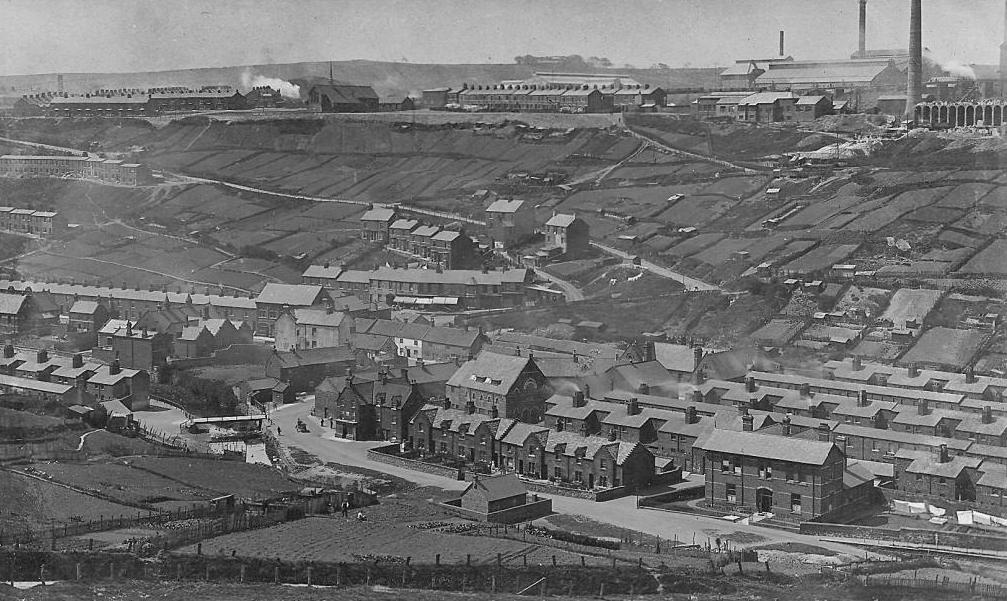
Skinningrove village and the works in distance (c.1911)

During the company's early period, much of the works output (pig iron) was shipped to Scotland – changes in the iron and steel market caused the works to start producing steel on site. Under Hutchinson's management, the number of furnaces was increased to four and later five; other improvements included the installation of Cowper stoves for heat regeneration, use of the Talbot process (a continuous open hearth process); and installation of electrically driven mill machinery. The works established its own mines at Boulby. The steel works were operational by 1911. Hutchinson remained manager until his death in 1918.

During the First World War, Skinningrove was targeted by Zeppelins. On 8 September 1915, an attack on the benzol works (a coke oven by product) failed to cause real damage; an attack on 5/6 Apr 1916 damaged laboratories; a further attack on 2 May 1916 also caused only minor damage.

In 1922, Pease and Partners began discussions on leasing the business, in which it already had a stake. By 1927, the Quaker firm of Pease and Partners had taken control of the business. The works began rolling double-headed rail in 90 feet (27 m) lengths in 1929, and 120 feet (37 m) lengths in 1937. Output was c.130,000 tons steel ingots in 1920 and 1929; in 1937 reduced to 100 thousand tons. In 1936/37 the business made a 6.4% profit (c. £0.1 million on capital of c. £1.6 million). Due to a significant downturn in the economy the blast furnaces at Skinningrove were shut down for five months in 1938, together with coke, limestone and mining operations.

In 1945, the works had an output of around 200,000 tons (pig iron) pa, with its main products being angles and rails. In 1947, the company received approval from the Iron and Steel board for a £1.7 million investment in the works, with a new blast furnace and 300-ton open hearth steelmaking plant to be added, together with improvements to equipment intended to increase steelmaking capacity by 40% to over 300,000 tons (pig iron) pa. In the same year the Loftus Ironstone Mine was transferred from the parent Pease and Partners to the Skinningrove company.

In 1951, the works (Skinningrove Iron Co. Ltd.) was nationalised into the Iron and Steel Corporation of Great Britain. The Pease Partners received £155,850 for the ordinary shares of the company. A sinter plant was opened in 1960. In 1963, it was taken out of public ownership, and acquired by Iron and Steel Investment Ltd., formed by a consortium of steel firms.

In 1967, British Steel Corporation (BSC) was formed, which had a 90% shareholding in the Skinningrove works. From 1967, the process began of rationalising the UK steel industry. In October 1971, the blast furnaces ceased operation, and open hearth steelmaking closed soon after, with the works being supplied with steel from the former Dorman Long works in Lackenby. The workforce was cut to around 400 with c. 250 redundancies. As part of this rationalisation Skinningrove was chosen to specialise in special profiles within BSC.

A plant of the Caterpillar Inc company was built on former ironworks land adjacent to the mill in 1997, producing track shoes for construction and mining equipment – the mill's product range includes profiles for such equipment.

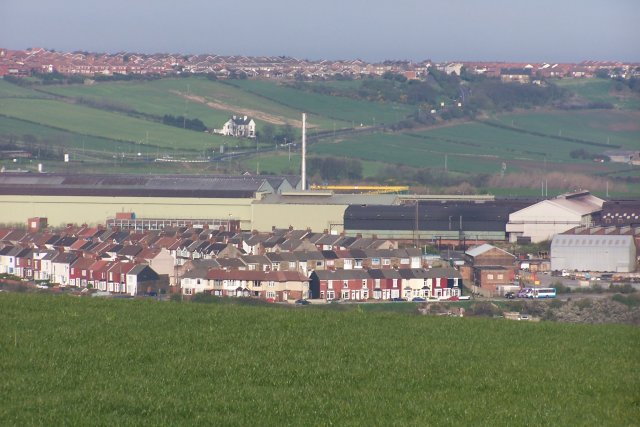
The works and village (2005)

The works together with other BSC companies became part of Corus Group plc in 1999, and Tata Steel Europe in 2006.

In 2016, Tata Europe's long products division, with Scunthorpe Steelworks as the main site, and including the special sections mill at Skinningrove, was sold to Greybull Capital.

== See also ==
- Cleveland Railway, railway connecting Skinningrove to Middlesbrough, built 1860s/70s
