= Lancashire Steel Corporation =

British steel producer

The Lancashire Steel Corporation Ltd was a United Kingdom steel producer. The company was formed in 1930 by amalgamating the iron and steel interests of the Pearson & Knowles Coal & Iron Co, the Partington Steel & Iron Co, and the Wigan Coal & Iron Co. The company was nationalised in 1951, becoming part of the Iron and Steel Corporation of Great Britain, but de-nationalised shortly afterwards. It was renationalised in 1967, becoming part of the British Steel Corporation.

The main works were at Irlam.

== Sources ==
- Whitaker's Almanack (various dates)
