= Scoria (disambiguation) =

Scoria is a type of vesicular volcanic rock.

Scoria may also refer to:

- Scoria (wrestler), Mexican wrestler, also known as Escoria
- Elvis Scoria (born 1971), Croatian football player
- Slag, or other waste from iron production
  - Scoria brick, a kind of brick made of iron slag from North-East England
- Scoria, a synonym of the moth genus Siona (moth)
