= Scunthorpe Steelworks =

Industrial complex in northern England

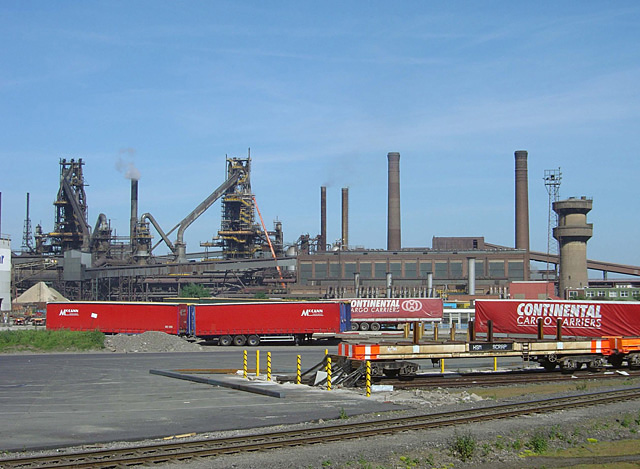
Scunthorpe steelworks (2006)

Scunthorpe Steelworks is an integrated steel mill with blast furnaces in North Lincolnshire, England. It is owned by the UK government which nationalised the plant in July 2026. As of April 2025, the facility employs around 2,700 people. It is the only steel mill in the UK capable of producing virgin steel, which is used in major construction projects like new buildings and railways. The rest of the UK's steel industry produces recycled steel using electric arc furnaces.

The iron and steel industry in Scunthorpe was established in the mid-19th century, following the discovery and exploitation of middle Lias ironstone, east of Scunthorpe (Lincolnshire).

Initially, iron ore was exported to iron producers in South Yorkshire. Later, after the construction of the Trent, Ancholme and Grimsby Railway (1860s) gave rail access to the area, local iron production rapidly expanded, using local ironstone and imported coal or coke. The local ore was relatively poor in iron (around 25% average) and high in lime (CaCO_{3}) requiring co-smelting with more acidic silicious iron ores. The growth of industry in the area led to the development of the town of Scunthorpe in a formerly sparsely populated, entirely agricultural area.

From the early 1910s to the 1930s, the industry consolidated, with three main ownership concerns formed—the Appleby-Frodingham Steel Company, part of the United Steel Companies; the Redbourn Iron Works, part of Richard Thomas and Company of South Wales (later Richard Thomas and Baldwins); and John Lysaght's Normanby Park works, part of Guest, Keen and Nettlefolds.

In 1967, all three works became part of the nationalised British Steel Corporation (BSC), leading to a period of further consolidation—from the 1970s the use of local or regional ironstone diminished, being replaced by imported ore via the Immingham Bulk Terminal—much of the steelworks was re-established with equipment at or south and east of the Appleby-Frodingham works during the late 1960s as part of the Anchor modernisation. Primary iron production was at four blast furnaces first established or expanded in the 1950s, and known as the four Queens: named Queen Anne, Bess, Victoria and Mary.

Both the Normanby Park and the Redbourn works were closed by the early 1980s. Conversion to the Linz-Donawitz process (LD) of steel making from the open hearth process took place from the late 1960s onwards, with an intermediate oxygen utilising open hearth process known as the AJAX furnace operated in the interim. Conversion to LD operation was complete by the 1990s.

Following privatisation in 1988, the company, together with the rest of BSC, became part of Corus (1999), later Tata Steel Europe (2007). In 2016, the long products division of Tata Steel Europe was sold to Greybull Capital with Scunthorpe as the primary steel production site, under the historic British Steel name. Jingye Group purchased British Steel in 2020. Following the risk of job losses, the Labour party parliament stepped in to take control of the plant from Jingye Group and fully nationalised it in July 2026, protecting its workforce and equipment.

Following the closure of the last blast furnace at Port Talbot Steelworks in Wales in September 2024, Scunthorpe Steelworks is the UK's only remaining primary steelmaking facility.

== History ==
=== Background and geology ===
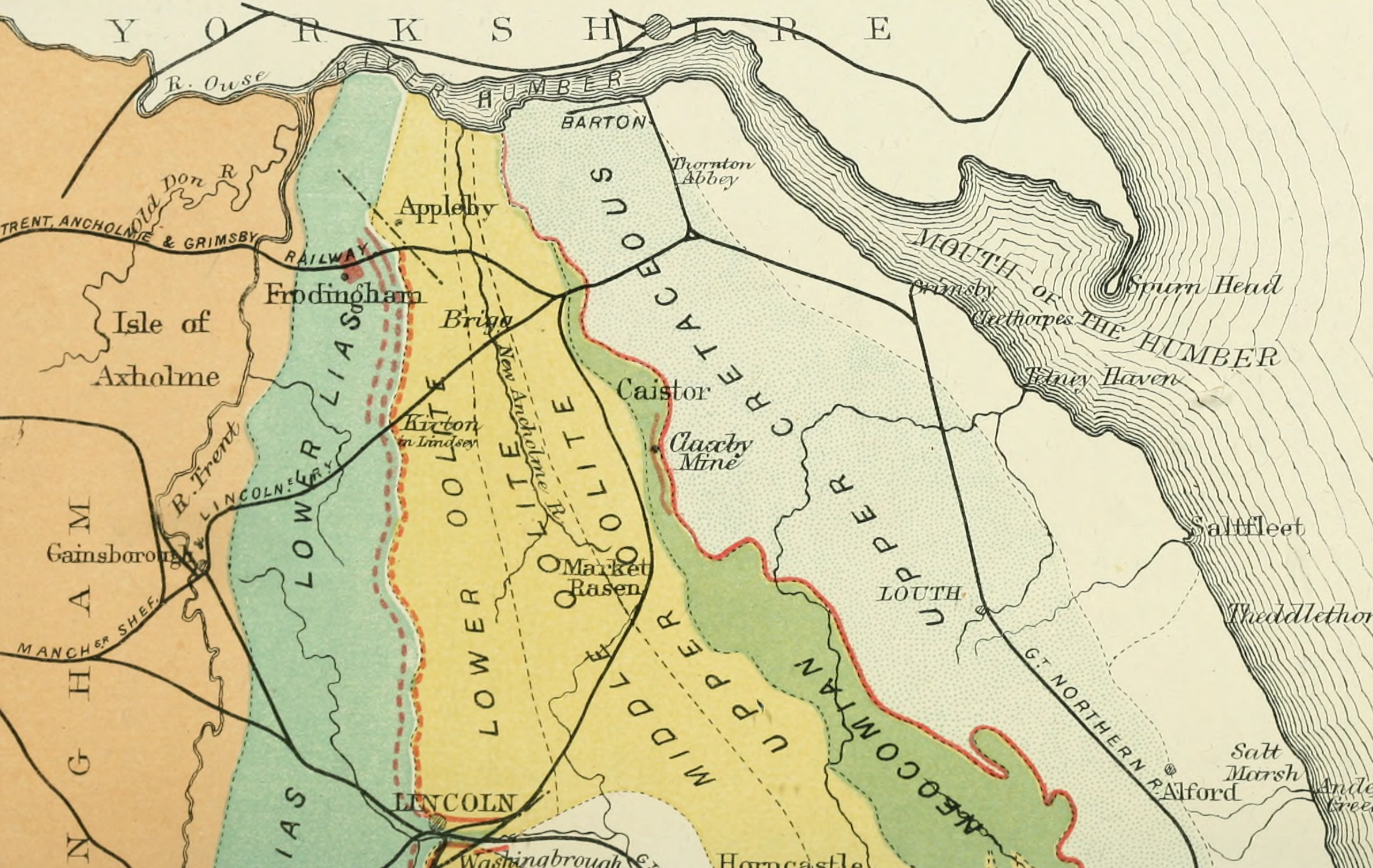
Geology of northern Lincolnshire. Near surface iron ore formations in red (NEIMME Transactions, v.24, 1875)

It is thought that the iron deposits in Lincolnshire were worked sometime before the 19th and 20th century exploitations—forges at Stowe are mentioned in the Domesday Book, and archaeological evidence has been found of iron working at Scunthorpe.

The ironstone in Lincolnshire is thought to have been laid down during the Jurassic period and forms part of a series of ironstones found in eastern England found in the Lias Group of rock strata that also includes ironstone formations making up the Cleveland ironstones and Northamptonshire ironstones; iron deposits in Northern France and Southern Germany may also be from the same period and origin. The Lincolnshire ironstone is found in the Lower Lias band in the Lower Jurassic series/period, it is a nearly horizontal bed, 10 to 25 feet (3.0 to 7.6 m) thick, averaging 12 feet (3.7 m), and consists of calcareous haematite; near the surface the ores are converted to a hydrous form, limonite. The deposit is thought to have been originally created by the deposition by precipitation of Iron(II) containing waters, followed by oxidation via weathering to Iron(III). Characteristic fossils found in the ironstone beds included large ammonites, and gryphaea, cardinia, and other mollusc species.

The geological strata in Lincolnshire includes a number of iron bearing rocks including (downwards) the Claxby ironstone (Claxby, Lower Cretaceous period); the Lincoln ironstone; the Caythorpe ironstone (Caythorpe, Middle Lias period), below which is the 'Frodingham Ironstone' once mined at Scunthorpe. At Frodingham the ironstone existed in a bed up to 35 feet (11 m) thick, covered by loose sand. The ore was found in the form of a calcareous hydrated oxide, with some oolitic nodules, much affected by water weathering; local variations within the ore bed included bands with iron content as high as 40%, down to 12%, with an average iron content of 25%, excluding spoil. The ironstone bed dipped slightly towards the east—the bed's proximity to the surface, its fair uniformity, and the general low value of the land on which it stood led to rapid development of open ore workings. The lime content of the ore rendered it self-fluxing, but its high lime content and basic nature were problematic and led to the practice of using it in combination with silica containing ores (for slag formation). Iron produced from the bed including the fossiliferous lime contained over 1% phosphorus, similar to that from the Cleveland ironstone, as well as a few per cent of manganese.

Ironstone extraction was almost entirely east of a roughly north–south boundary passing through Scunthorpe between the town and steelworks—this boundary was itself east of the Lower Lias escarpment (Trent Cliff). Iron ore extraction was reduced in the later half of the 20th century, to be substituted by foreign imported ores of better quality.

=== Establishment of iron ore extraction and smelting (1859–1912) ===
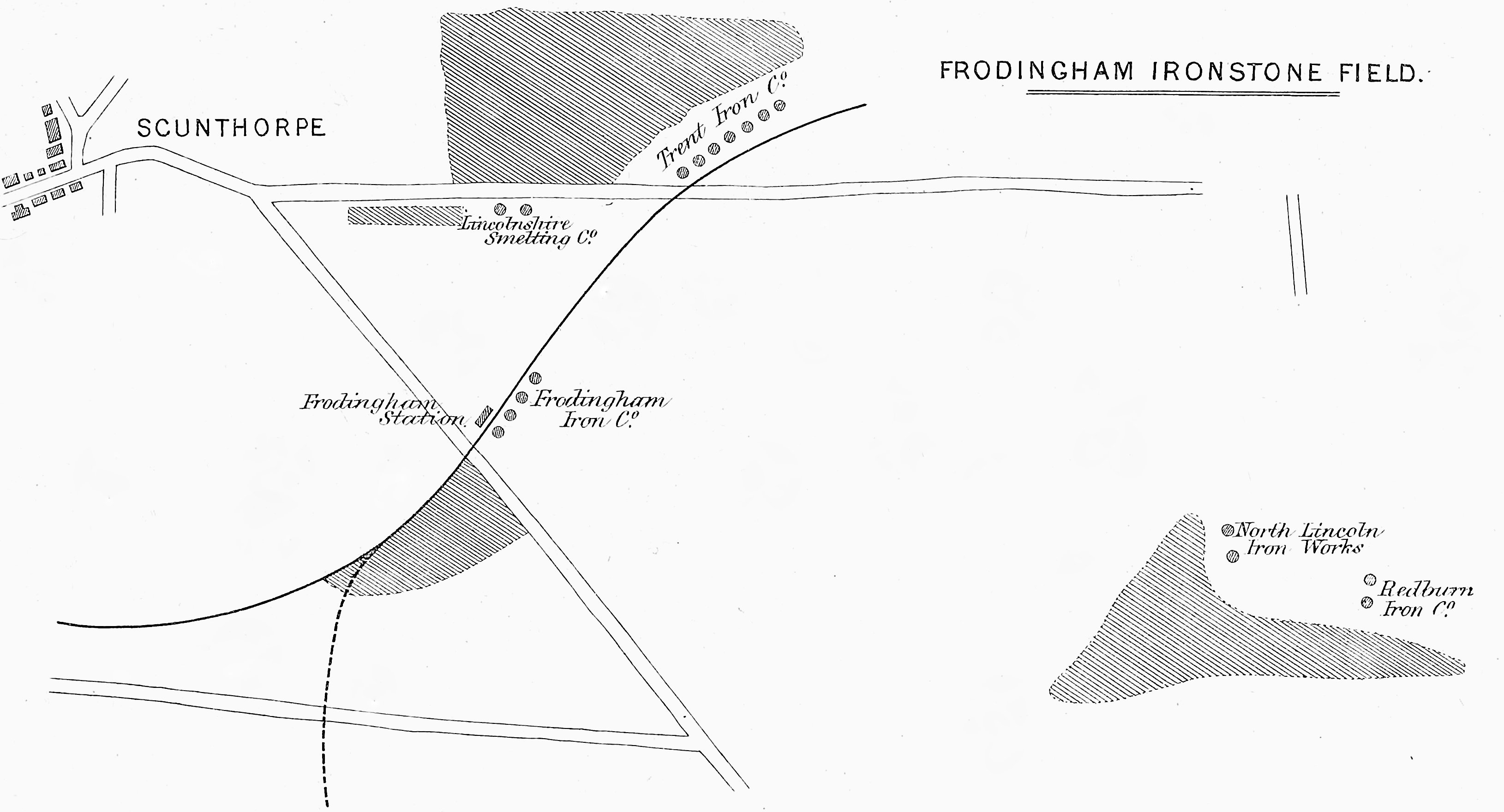
Ironstone working and production c. 1865 (NEIMME Transactions, v.24, 1875)

Rowland Winn is credited with (re-)discovering the iron ore in the area, and having it analysed and promoting its use. He suspected that the geology on his estate resembled the Cleveland ironstone which had been discovered and exploited in northern Yorkshire (see Middlesbrough). Initially ore was extracted and exported from leases on his estate, and transported by horse power to the River Trent and onwards by canal. Iron ore began to be commercially exploited in the area from 1859. A narrow gauge railway was opened c. 1861 to Gunness.

Winn then was instrumental in the promotion of a line to the ore fields, and with the support of the Manchester, Sheffield and Lincolnshire Railway (MSLR) and the South Yorkshire Railway (SYR) as equal third partners; an act of parliament for a new main line, the Trent, Ancholme and Grimsby Railway was obtained in 1861. The new line connected with the SYR via a bridge over the River Trent at Keadby to the west, giving access to the South Yorkshire coalfield; and to the MSLR in the east at Barnetby. The line was fully opened by 1866, and enabled rapid expansion of the iron business around Scunthorpe. A 0.25 miles (0.40 km) branch to further iron ore deposits near Santon was authorised and opened 1872/3.

W. H. and G. Dawes (Elsecar) were the first to utilise the ore which was tested at blast furnaces at Barnsley, transported there by water. In 1862 the Dawes began to build the first blast furnace in the area, which became operational in 1864, operating as the Trent Iron Company. (Note: 53.593465°N 0.629560°W, Trent Iron Works (historic)) The Frodingham Iron Company also opened in 1864, (Note: 53.589787°N 0.632483°W, Frodingham Iron Works (historic)) established by Joseph Cliff, a firebrick manufacturer from Wortley, Leeds who used experienced iron makers from Stockton-upon-Tees to establish the business. Both produced iron from their own local ironstone leases.

North Lincolnshire Iron Works, (Note: 53.586360°N 0.618064°W, North Lincolnshire Iron Works (historic)) was established by Daniel Adamson of Hyde, Manchester in 1866, supported by Lancashire capitalists; the business was supplied with ore from Winn's own mines. Over the next decade three more works were established: the Redbourn Hill Company, (Note: 53.586635°N 0.613511°W, Redbourn Hill Iron Works (historic)) and the Lincolnshire Iron Smelting Company (Note: Pocock 1990 refers to this enterprise as the Lindsey Iron Works. The plant became known as the Lindsey or North Lindsey works after it was taken over by the Redbourn Hill Company.) were supported by capital from Birmingham; the Appleby Iron works was established with capital from Scotland. (Note: 53.595275°N 0.605050°W, Appleby Iron Works (historic)) All six iron works were located adjacent to the ore workings, with the low iron content of the ore favouring local working rather than transportation to external sites.

By 1875 there were 13 blast furnaces in operation, with others under construction. Coke (or coal) was used, supplied from the Durham coalfield or the South Yorkshire coalfield. Initially the high lime content of the ore (up to 68%) caused production issues, through the amount and form of the slag produced, and its basic nature, its corrosive effect on the refractories in the furnace, as well as the large amount of water content in the ore, and carbon dioxide release tending to damp the fire in the furnace. The primary solution to the basic ore was to co-fire with an imported silica containing ore.

Iron ore production reached 248,329 tons, and iron production 31,000 tons by 1870, both rapid increases. In addition to local blast furnaces the ore was supplied to the Milton ironworks (Barnsley), Elsecar ironworks (Barnsley), the West Yorkshire Coal and Iron Company (West Ardsley), and the Park Gate Iron Company (Rotherham). By 1875 several businesses were extracting iron ore in the area including Cliff and Sons (Frodingham); the Kiveton Park Company; W.H. and G. Dawes; Cliff and Sons (Leeds); the Park Gate Iron Company (Frodingham); and Charles Winn.

Appleby Ironworks was established in 1875. By the 1880s the iron making district consisted of separate villages at Crosby, Scunthorpe, Frodingham and New Frodingham, with the iron ore fields and irons works to the east, in an otherwise essentially rural landscape consisting of enclosed fields and coppices. With the exception of housing built at New Frodingham and New Brumby to the south most of the housing expansion associated with the growth of the industry took place around the former village of Scunthorpe—by the beginning of the 20th century Scunthorpe had grown to town sized, and incorporated schools; churches; clubs; a cemetery; and a courthouse, bank and hotel. By 1901 the local population was 11,167 increased from a combined rural population (Scunthorpe, Ashby, Brumby etc.) of 1,245 in 1851.

The last business to establish an iron works in the area was Lysaght's, built 1908–1915 when it then came on stream producing heavy steel products for the war effort, notably armour plate for warships. The choice of the uphill site at Normanby Park, north of Scunthorpe, (Note: 53.612722°N 0.658773°W, John Lysaght's Iron Works (historic)) was made by the Chief Engineer, Samuel Henry 'Harry' Meakin. He was originally offered a site acquired by the Lysaght's at Flixborough on the River Trent, but pointed out that the geological strata were not strong enough to bear the weight of blast furnaces. He needed to build on hard ground, which of course hills always are.

Key components of the Normanby Park Works had in practice been designed in the drawing offices of Brymbo Steelworks in Wrexham, which S. H. Meakin had redesigned during 1905–1908. John Darby, the man in charge of that project, listened to Meakin's professional views on how a steelworks could be made even more efficient than was possible in Wrexham, told him to do the drawings anyway then keep them where they were unlikely to be found, or even understood. In due course (in about 1907) Darby then won a contract from the Lysaght Brothers to build a brand new steelworks in Scunthorpe, which he confidently asserted would be more efficient than anything seen before. That was destined to become Normanby Park. He then told Harry Meakin "I want you to join me on the new project, but my contract precludes me from poaching staff from Brymbo. So you will have to get yourself dismissed."

According to Harry Meakin's son Frank: "My father – who was 32 years old at the time – then played ducks and drakes at Brymbo for six months until they were forced to sack him." Harry Meakin then moved to Scunthorpe and joined John Darby again, whereupon he took charge of designing the new steelworks. Its upland site necessitated inter alia building large water mains up from the River Trent—steelworks use a huge amount of water. The design included modernistic features, such as the facility to burn gases from the blast furnace beneath the steel furnaces, but this was not proceeded with in practice. Upon completion, S. H. Meakin then managed the new Normanby Park steelworks for a year. However his primary interest was new design, rather than production, so he resigned and moved to Sheffield where he took charge of the design offices of Firth-Brown. S. H. Meakin's hobby was studying and mounting diatoms, for which activity—paradoxically—he is far better known today. (See Google, S. H. Meakin : the preceding Normanby Park details are taken from an interview in 2020 with Harry Meakin's grandson, Christopher Meakin, citing known family history).

=== Consolidation (1912–1966) ===
In 1912 the Frodingham company absorbed the Appleby company, both of which in 1917 became part of the United Steel Companies; the two firms were formally amalgamated into the Appleby-Frodingham Steel Company in 1934. In 1931/2 the former North Lincolnshire Ironworks became part of the group, followed by the Trent Ironworks in 1936. The Redbourn Iron Works became part of Richard Thomas and Company of South Wales in 1917 (after 1948 part of Richard Thomas and Baldwins). The Lysaght's Normanby Park works became part of Guest, Keen and Nettlefolds in 1919.

At the beginning of the First World War three of the six works were converting all of their iron production to steel, whilst much of the remainder was supplied to associated steel companies. Total pig iron production in 1917 was nearly 520,000 tons. Immediately preceding the war plans had been made to increase UK steel production by 2 million tons. In the Lincolnshire district two new blast furnaces and six steel furnaces were sanctioned in 1916; and two blast and three steel furnaces in 1917/18. By 1918 production of pig iron in the district had risen to around 650,000 tons. Iron and steel production in the district was reduced drastically immediately after the end of World War One with plants closed or output curtailed.

As the British economy recovered during the interbellum period the three Scunthorpe works increased their combined share of total UK steel production from 3% to 10%. In 1945 all steel from the Lincolnshire district was produced using the basic open hearth process, with no Bessemer or electric arc plant.

Experimental underground mining began in the 1930s, leading to the development of the Santon drift mine, with production beginning after the end of the Second World War. A second mine, Dragonby, was also opened in the post war period. Both mines were worked on the room and pillar system, with approximately 20 to 23 feet (6 to 7 m) height of extraction within the seams, leaving some ironstone for roof support (about 8 feet 2 inches (2.5 m) depth) and roadway. Drilling and blasting were used for extraction with much of the work mechanised.

16 bombs landed on the night of June 27, 1940.

By the mid 20th century Scunthorpe was expanding into a large town, to the west, north and south of the original village, and its extent now included the former villages of Crosby and Frodingham, and had reached as far south as Brumby. The steelworks and ironworkings had expanded east and to the north. The population of Scunthorpe reached over 45 thousand in 1941, and was to increase to over 66 thousand by the beginning of the 1980s.

In 1951 much of the British steel industry was briefly nationalised, as the Iron and Steel Corporation of Great Britain. However, in late 1951 a Conservative government was elected (see Third Churchill ministry) and the nationalisation decision reversed. The United Steel Companies was recreated; Richard Thomas and Baldwins was re-created with the separation of the Steel Company of Wales; and GKN re-acquired its former steel interests including those at Scunthorpe.

==== Applebly Frodingham ironworks ====
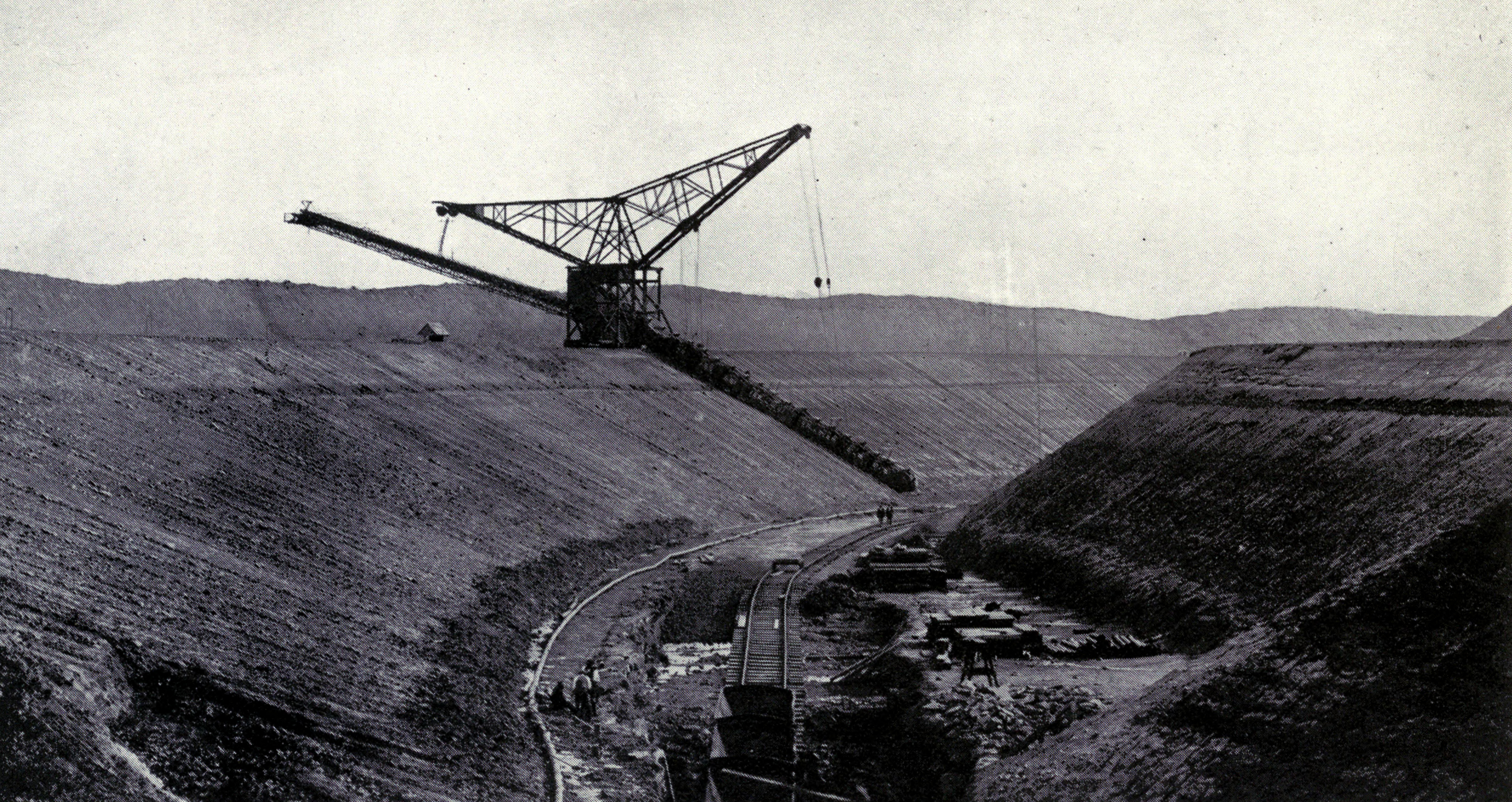
Bucket excavator at Frodingham Iron and Steel Company's quarries c. 1918

After merger the adjacent Appleby and Frodingham works both produced pig iron, with the Frodingham works specialising in bars and sections, and the Appleby works plates and slabs. In 1937 each site had four blast furnaces, each with two relatively modern builds, with a maximum diameter of 17 feet (5.2 m) in three; capacities of the four modern furnaces were two at 2,300 tons, one at 2,000 tons and one at 1,650 tons per week. Blast furnace gas was used at both sites to power electrical generators, and further energy recovery from the residual hot gas obtained from water tube boilers heated by the gas, or for heating in the steel works. Both works contained similar melting shops—the Appleby works had five tilting furnaces (open hearth) of 250- or 300-ton capacity. Employment over both sites was 6,500 in 1937. In the context of the wider United Steel group, rationalisation during the 1930s led the Appleby Frodingham works to be specialised in plates and heavy sections, whilst lighter section, bars, rod and wire were produced at the group's Steel, Peech and Tozer and Samuel Fox works in Yorkshire, with rails and ferroalloys at the Workington site. In 1945 the works was the largest in Britain, with a capacity of 700 million tons pa (5.5% national production), and occupied a 1,700 acres (690 ha) site.

In 1939 two 22 feet (6.7 m) diameter blast furnaces together with associated coke ovens and sinter plant were constructed on a site south of the earlier Appleby works, the location of the former North Lincolnshire Iron works. Here future expansion of the plant was focused replacing plant at the Frodingham works.

In the early 1950s the company expanded two of its blast furnaces to 25 feet (7.6 m) diameter (named "Queen Mary", No.9; and "Queen Bess"), and in 1951 took the decision to start the construction of two further new furnaces to a similar diameter. The new furnaces together with addition sinter plant were constructed on former ironstone quarry land. The new 27 and 28.5 feet (8.2 and 8.7 m) furnaces were official opened in mid 1954, and older plant abandoned, with total capacity increased from 900,000 to 1,250,000 tons pa. The blast furnaces were named "Queen Anne" (No.3, 27 ft) and "Queen Victoria" (No.4, 28.5 ft). In addition to the new plant new sinter equipment was constructed, allowing the works to operate on near 100% sinter use in the blast furnaces—part of the rationale for the sinter investment was the deterioration of the quality of the locally mined ore, resulting in increasing quantities of fines in the ore. The expansion led to the closure of the iron works at Frodingham and the North Lincs works; the last blast furnace in operation at Frodingham, No.1, was shut down in May 1954.

During the decade after c. 1957 onwards the Appleby-Frodingham works pioneered the use of a variation of the open hearth furnace utilising oxygen named the AJAX furnace. The AJAX furnaces functioned as a transition technology prior to the introduction of the Linz-Donawitz process (basic oxygen) for steel production by the company c. 1966.

==== Normanby Park works, John Lysaght ====
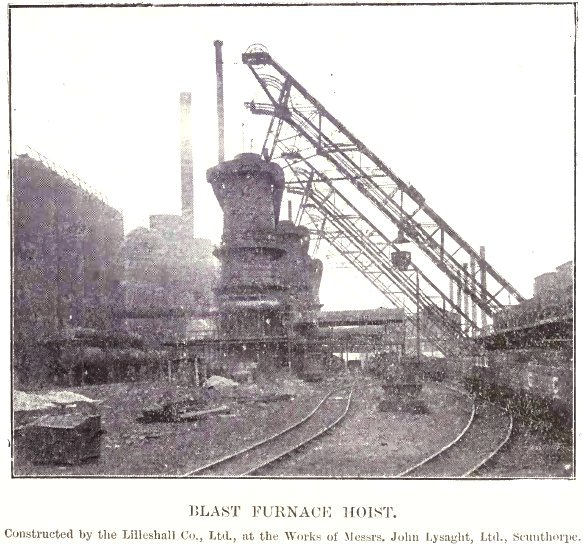
Blast furnaces at John Lysaght's works c. 1911

At the beginning of the 20th century John Lysaght & Co. investigated opportunities to integrate backwards by producing steel for its rolling mills in South Wales. A number of schemes were considered including a works at Newport, South Wales; the acquisition of the Westbury Iron Company (Wiltshire); or a new works near Scunthorpe. Discussions and agreement with Sir Berkeley Sheffield on a lease of the iron ore containing land were made in 1905, and the decision was taken to establish a steelworks, with the estimated capital cost at under £350,000.

During the Depression of 1920–21 the works was temporarily closed—iron and steel production was resumed in 1922 but the works operated at under capacity for the remainder of the decade. At the beginning of the Great Depression of the 1930s the works was reconstructed at a cost of £400,000 to specialise outside general mass market steels—as a result capacity utilising was at 80% compared to an industry average of nearer 50%, though with very low profit margins. During this period the works was primary supplier to the company's Orb Works in Newport.

Due to oversupply in the industry the blast furnaces were again temporarily shut down in 1938. In 1939 the company was notified by government official that the works would be required to supply steel for projectile Shells.

During the post war period the works was planned to increase output to 500,000 ingot tons pa—by 1955 this figure had been exceeded with production at 600,000 tons pa. Two Linz-Donawitz process converters of 60 tons capacity each were installed in 1964.

==== Redbourn Hill ironworks ====
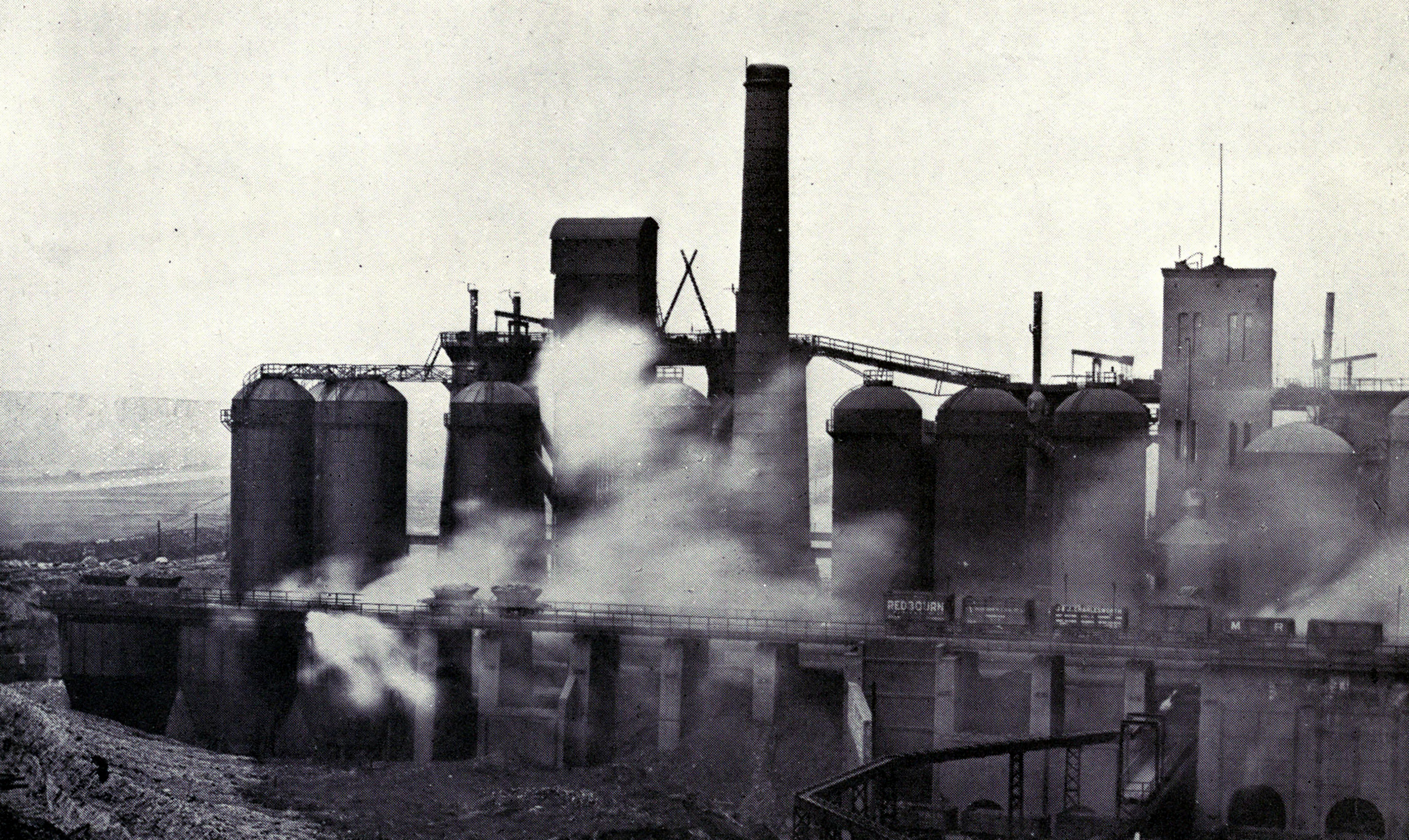
Extended Redbourn Hill works c. 1918

The Redbourne Hill works shares were held by Monks and Hall (Warrington) in 1905, but sold to the Cwmfelin Steel and Tinplate Company (owned by a son of Richard Thomas) in 1907/8. Initially the works functioned as a source of pig iron.

In 1933 a bar mill was transferred from the parent company's bar mill at Tredegar South Wales to the Redbourn site. Later in the 1930s Richard Thomas and Baldwins considered establishing a continuous strip mill at their Redbourn works, but under government pressure in the context of difficult economic conditions and unemployment in South Wales reversed their decision and instead placed the development at the EbbVale ironworks sites.

A single 100 ton oxygen based (Oberhausen rotor) steelmaking converter was installed at Redbourn in 1961.

The Redbourn works was originally supplied by two hand charged furnaces built 1875. Furnaces 3 and 4 were added in 1909 and 1919. In 1951/2 the 1875 furnaces were replaced by a single furnace. No.4 furnace was closed in 1977, and No.3 furnace was closed in 1979; the last furnace, No.2 was shut down in October 1979.

=== British Steel Corporation period (1967–1999) ===
Nationalisation of UK steel operations led to the formation of the British Steel Corporation (BSC) in 1967. Scunthorpe was chosen by the corporation as one of the five main production centres, formally within the Midland regional division of BSC, and designated as a general steel producers. Placing the three steel producers in the town under shared ownership gave opportunities for rationalisation and greater efficiency—excess liquid steel and sinter were transferred between the works by rail. Within the whole of BSC the 7 ft plate mill at Appleby-Frodingham (and at West Hartlepool) was closed and production transferred to Lackenby, North Yorkshire in around 1970. Under the rationalisation scheme known as the 'Heritage Programme' closures corresponding to 1.59 and 0.81 million tons of ingot steel were announced for Appleby-Frodingham and Redbourn works to take effect in 1973/4 and 1972/3 respectively. The Dragonby and Santon mines were worked as a single unit from 1969.

In the early 1970s the UK government announced £3 billion investment plan to modernise the companies main steel production sites (Scunthorpe, Lackenby, Llanwern, Ravenscraig, Port Talbot), increasing productivity by 50%, and reducing the total workforce by 50,000. Changes and modernisation at Scunthorpe were planned under several phases for Scunthorpe, under a scheme known as the "Anchor Project", which had its basis in an £80 million proposal made by the Appleby-Frodingham company in 1966 to the regulating Iron and Steel Board for LD converter conversion with a capacity of around 2 million tons pa, plus a 2 million ton pa slab mill and investment increasing light plate production to 1 million tons pa; foreign ore would also be used to increase productivity. When accepted by BSC in 1969 the expanded project had a cost of £130 million (rising to £230 million by 1971), and included three 300 ton LD converters, as well as a continuous plate mill later rejected, and other improvements. During the formulation of the plan the option of relocating the Scunthorpe-based steel production to a coastal site (i.e. Port of Immingham) had been considered but rejected. Work on the 1,000 acres (400 ha) former ore field site south and east of the older works began in early 1970. The new Anchor works including steelmaking, continuous casting and rolling mills was officially opened in 1974 by Queen Elizabeth II.

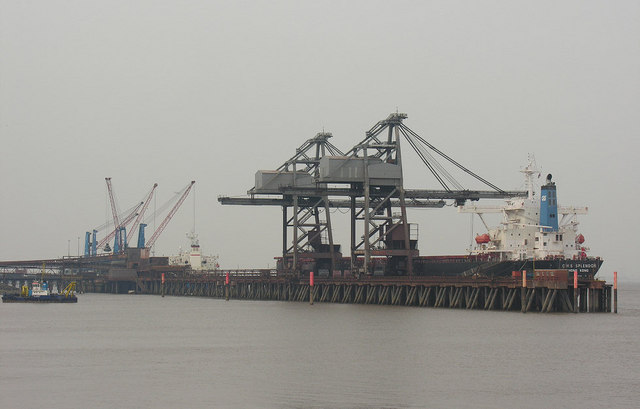
Immingham Bulk Terminal at the Port of Immingham est.1970 (2007)

The development of an ore terminal as part of the Anchor project was authorised; use of local or regionally imported ores ceased or was greatly reduced, as a consequence of increased importation of foreign ores of far greater iron content. The Port of Immingham became a key part of the overall infrastructure of the Scunthorpe steelworks as an importation point. The Immingham Bulk Terminal was constructed c. 1970-2 as a joint venture between BSC and the National Coal Board (NCB). Ore was to be supplied to the steelworks by a Merry-go-round train system. At the Normanby Park site ore was supplied from the stockyards built for the Appleby-Frodingham Anchor project by a conveyor.

In the early 1970s BSC planning considered the 5 million ingot steel tons pa Anchor site as a core asset, and the 1.1 million tons pa former Lysaght's Normanby works as marginal. The economic downturn following the 1973 oil crisis (see Steel crisis) contributed to large scale reduction in the BSC workforce overall, to under a third of the 180,000 employed in the UK industry as a whole in 1975; this in combination with loss of certain privileges and management requests for flexible working, reduction in manning, and wage cuts or wage freezes led to large scale conflict in the industry as a whole over several years. A national strike (led by the Iron and Steel Trades Confederation) took place from January to March 1980. In the wider business steel production ended at Shotton (1978), Consett (1980), Corby (1981) and Clydeside (1982).

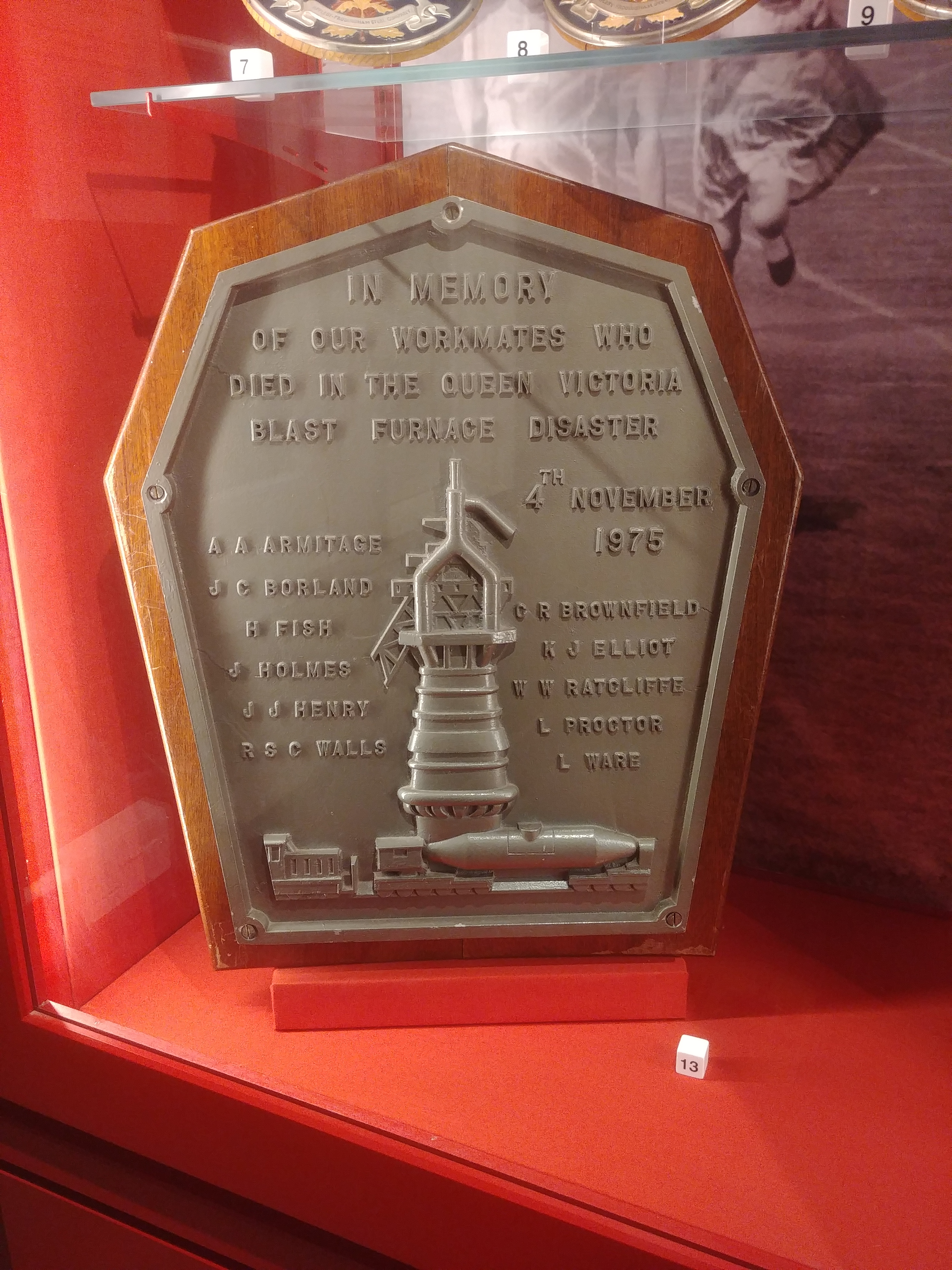
Queen Victoria Blast Furnace Disaster Memorial, North Lincolnshire Museum

On 4 November 1975 four workers were killed at the Queen Victoria furnace, and others badly injured following an explosion in a torpedo car due to water ingress into the molten steel filled vessel. In total 11 persons eventually died due to their injuries.

Around the beginning of the 1980s BSC made significant cutbacks to operations at Scunthorpe: all the ore mines closed; and most of the Redbourn works was shut, use of the Lysaght's Normanby Park site ended c. 1981. with all liquid steel production at the site ended by 1979. In 1982 works employment was 8,900. In 1967 ore production at Scunthorpe had been 4.7 million tons pa; from 1981 to 1987 local ore production had dropped to around 1 million tons and then to 120,000 tons with only one quarry (Yarborough) in operation. Underground mining ended in 1981.

In late 1982 a continuous caster for billets was installed. Facilities at the works in 1983 included a 300t basic oxygen steelmaker; billet, bloom and slab continuous casters; and desulphurisation and degassing equipment.

BSC was privatised in 1988 by the British Steel Act 1988.

By c. 1990 the steelworks had been entirely converted from the open hearth to basic oxygen steel making process—the works employed 7,300 persons and had a production capacity of around 5 million tons pa of steel.

=== Corus/Tata period (1999–2016) ===
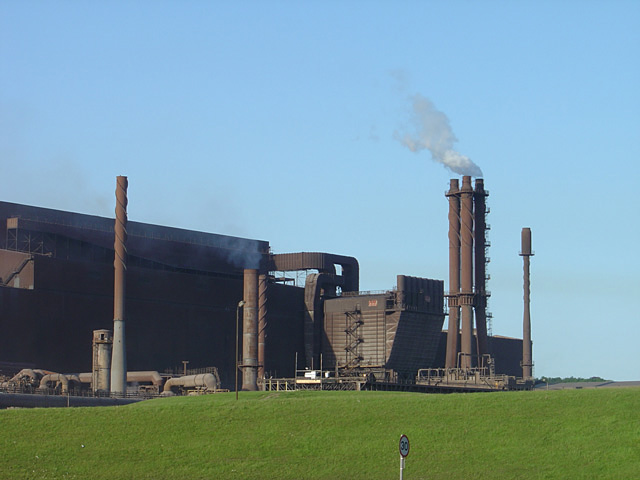
Basic oxygen and continuous casting building (2006)

In 1999 BSC merged with Koninklijke Hoogovens of the Netherlands to form Corus.

In 2004 the Heavy Section Mill (HSM) was closed with the loss of about 150 jobs, Manufacture of sheet piling ceased at the HSM in July 2004 at Scunthorpe and the company sold the remnants of its sheet piling business (sales) to Arcelor. In 2005 Corus announced an investment plan for its long products division: a £130 million investment at Scunthorpe into the medium section mill, focusing on rail production, with the a corresponding end to rail production at its site in Workington, UK; other investment included a new bloom caster, reheat furnace and breakdown mill for the rod mill.

Corus was acquired by Tata Steel in 2007, forming Tata Steel Europe. The 2008 financial crisis and the Great Recession led to reduction in demand for steel and reduced profitability. The Queen Bess furnace was mothballed in 2008.

In 2011 a billet caster and bloom mill were closed, replaced by a new £55 million casting machine, ordered in 2005. The Queen Bess furnace was relit in early 2014, to maintain production whilst the Queen Anne furnace was shut down and relined at a cost of around £30 million. The Queen Anne furnace was relit in October 2014.

As a consequence of reduced profitability Tata Group sought to sell much of its European steel operations. In 2014 Scunthorpe works were offered as part of Tata Steel Europe's long products division, with the Klesch Group as potential buyer; the acquisition process was ended mid 2015 by Klesch with no sale. In 2015 Tata announced the loss of 900 jobs at the Scunthorpe site, with reductions including the closure/mothballing of the plate mill (350 persons), and closure of the Dawes Lane coke ovens (140 persons). The plate mill ceased production in December 2015, and the Dawes Lane coke ovens ceased production in March 2016, with all coke production transferred to the Appleby coke ovens.

=== British Steel period (2016–present) ===
==== Greybull Capital ownership and liquidation ====
In April 2016 the long products division including the Scunthorpe works as the only primary steel producer and main employer was sold by Tata to Greybull Capital for a nominal sum of £1. The business was renamed British Steel Ltd.

In May 2019, British Steel was placed into compulsory liquidation. Control of the company passed to the official receiver while a buyer was found.

==== Jingye Group ownership ====
In March 2020, Jingye Group, a Chinese steelmaker, became the owner of British Steel. Many investments were foreseen: for the Scunthorpe site, the construction of a new 250 MW power plant, expected to be around a third more efficient than that it replaces, was announced. Other investment were also foreseen on the rolling mills, to produce high-quality rolled products.

Following the purchase, Jingye Group invested £330 million in capital projects during its first three years of ownership. British Steel now employs 4,300 people in the UK.

The closure of the coke plant was announced in February 2023 with the loss of 260 jobs.

On 6 November 2023, British Steel announced the blast furnaces at Scunthorpe were to be decommissioned and replaced with two electric arc furnaces (EAFs). Under the plans, one of the new furnaces would be located at Scunthorpe, and the other at Teesside. The move is expected to cost £1.25 billion and result in the loss of up to 2,000 jobs.

Planning permission for the new electric arc furnace at Scunthorpe was granted by North Lincolnshire Council in April 2024.

In November 2024, British Steel opened a new £10 million 'rail hub' which has the capacity to hold 25,000 tonnes of rail in 354 ft (108 m) lengths.

It was reported in December 2024 that talks regarding the necessary investment at Scunthorpe Steelworks between the government and Jingye were in difficulty, with the government considering nationalising British Steel as a last resort if the discussions ultimately failed. The same report also stated that the plan for the second EAF at Teesside had been dropped.

===== Government control =====
In April 2025, the Steel Industry (Special Measures) Act 2025 was passed during an emergency sitting of Parliament in order to give the Secretary of State for Business and Trade powers to direct the actions of British Steel, while stopping short of direct nationalisation.

==== Nationalisation ====
In May 2026, the government announced that, following an unsuccessful search for private investment, British Steel would be nationalised. Legislation to enable this was introduced in Parliament shortly afterwards.

The nationalisation legislation received royal assent and became law as the Steel Industry (Nationalisation) Act 2026 on 15 July; British Steel was formally nationalised the following day.

== Legacy and environment ==
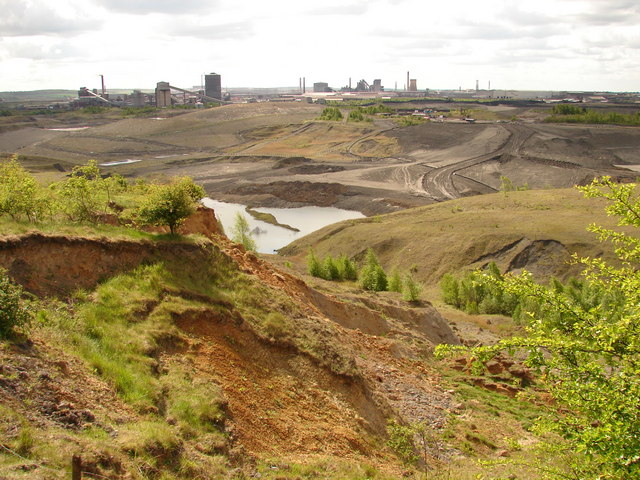
Former ironstone workings (2009)

The town of Scunthorpe exists primarily due to the development of the iron ore and steel industry in the area, changing the character of the area from almost entirely rural to one of a large heavy industrial enterprise and town in a rural setting. As a consequence most of the buildings in the town date to the late 19th or 20th century.

After closure the underground ironstone working caused serious subsidence in some areas due to washing out of clay causing delayed collapse. Parts of the surface ironstone workings were restored using company and governmental contributed funds during the late 20th century; some workings such as the Winterton quarry were utilised as landfill sites.

According to the Environment Agency (2000), British Steel plc (Scunthorpe, Llanwern, Port Talbot, Redcar) was the biggest industrial polluter of dioxins in the United Kingdom.

== See also ==
- Monotown, single industry towns, common under centrally planned soviet Russia
- Singleton Birch, supplier of limestone to works from a nearby quarry in Melton Ross.
