= Tata Steel Europe =

Multinational steelmaking company

Tata Steel Europe Ltd.
- Formerly: Corus Group plc (1999–2010)
- Type: Subsidiary
- Industry: Steel industry
- Predecessor: British Steel plc (1967–1999); Koninklijke Hoogovens (1918–1999)
- Defunct: 1 October 2021
- Fate: Separation
- Successor: British Steel Limited (2016); Tata Steel UK; Tata Steel Netherlands
- Headquarters: London, England, UK
- Area served: Europe
- Key people: Dr. Henrik Adam, Chairman TSE
- Revenue: ▼US$2.167 billion (2017)
- Operating income: ▼ −US$127 million (2016)
- Total assets: ▲US$6.22 billion
- Total equity: ▼US$2.79 billion
- Number of employees: ▼21,000 (2017)
- Parent: Tata Steel
- Website: tatasteeleurope.com

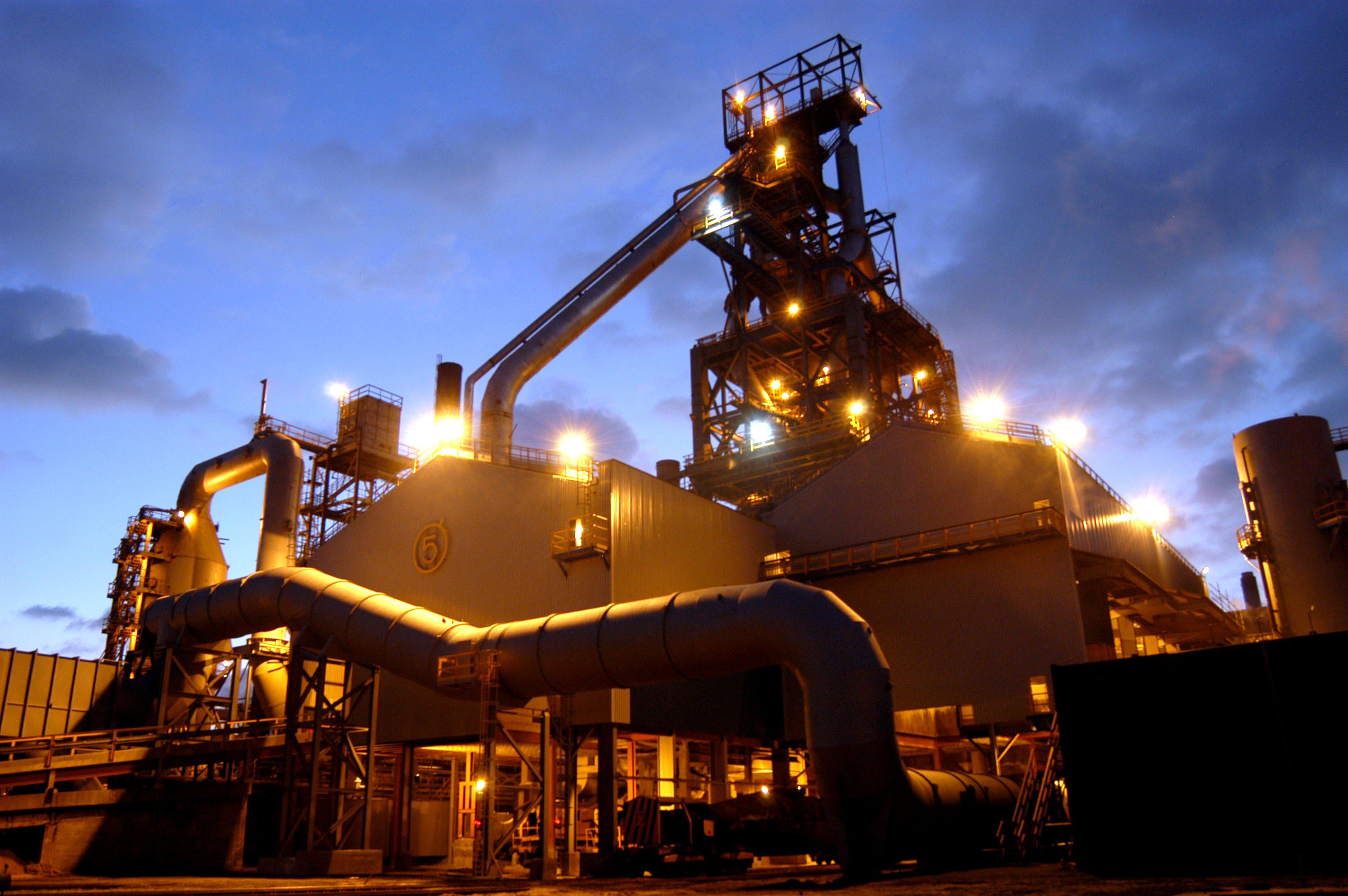
Blast Furnace 5 at the Port Talbot Steelworks

Tata Steel Europe Ltd. (formerly Corus Group plc) was a steelmaking company headquartered in London, England, with its main operations in the United Kingdom and the Netherlands. In 2021, the company was split into a British and a Dutch branch: Tata Steel Netherlands (TSN) and Tata Steel UK, both of which fell directly under the Indian parent company Tata Steel.

Corus Group was formed through the merger of the Koninklijke Hoogovens and British Steel plc in October 1999. A constituent of the FTSE 100 Index, Corus operated steelmaking plants (blast furnaces) in Port Talbot and Llanwern, Wales; Scunthorpe and Hartlepool, England; and IJmuiden, Netherlands, with additional steelmaking facilities in Rotherham, England (electric arc furnace), as well as downstream steel production of both long and flat steel. In August 2006, Corus divested its aluminium rolled products and extrusions businesses to Aleris International, Inc..

In 2007, Corus Group was taken over by the Indian conglomerate Tata Group; it was rebranded as Tata Steel Europe in September 2010. The business' profitability was negatively impacted by the Great Recession, resulting in the Hartlepool plant being mothballed and sold in the late 2000s. During April 2016, the long products division, including the steelworks at Scunthorpe, was sold for a nominal sum to Greybull Capital.

== History ==
=== Background – Corus ===
British Steel plc was a large British steel producer, consisting of the assets of former private companies which had been nationalised on 28 July 1967 by the Labour Party government of Harold Wilson. On 5 December 1988 the company was privatised as a result of the British Steel Act 1988. The Koninklijke Hoogovens (lit. Royal Blast furnaces) was a Royal Dutch steel and aluminium producer founded in 1918, located in IJmuiden, Netherlands. The plant is now called Tata Steel IJmuiden.

In October 1999, British Steel merged with Koninklijke Hoogovens to form Corus Group plc. At its formation, the steel company was the largest in Europe and the third largest worldwide. The French steel company Sogerail, specialising in rail manufacture, was acquired in 1999 shortly before the merger of BSC for £83 million.

In 2001, Corus announced it was enacting 6,050 jobs cuts over the following two years. In 2003, Corus became the sole owner of SEGAL, a galvanizing company established in 1983 as a joint venture.

In March 2006, Corus announced that it had agreed to sell its aluminium rolled products and extrusions businesses to Aleris International, Inc. for €728million (£572 million). Corus was to retain its smelting operations and supply Aleris under a long-term agreement. On 1 August, the sale to Aleris Europe was completed. The sale took place in May 2006.

In 2006 the Mannstaedt works (Troisdorf, Germany, special profiles, acquired by BSC in 1990) was sold to Georgsmarienhütte (GMH Holding).

=== Takeover by Tata Steel ===
On 20 October 2006, Corus announced that it had accepted at £4.3 billion ($8.1 billion) offer from the Indian conglomerate Tata Steel; a valuation of £4.55 per share. The combination of Corus (18.18MT pa) and Tata (4.4MT pa) would create the fifth largest steelmaking company worldwide. Tata surprised the credit default swap segment of the derivative markets by deciding to raise $6.17 billion of debt for the deal through a new subsidiary of Corus called 'Tata Steel UK', rather than by raising the debt itself. Tata's security credit rating was investment grade, whereas the new subsidiary may not be. The higher risk associated with raising debt through a subsidiary with a lower credit rating prompted Fitch Ratings to downgrade its rating of the credit swap risks in the takeover to 'negative'. Fitch also stated that Corus' responsibility for the debt may lead to Corus' own unsecured debt rating being downgraded. This does not affect the rating of bonds issued by Corus which are secured debt.

On 19 November 2006, the Brazilian steel company Companhia Siderúrgica Nacional (CSN) launched a counter offer for Corus at a higher valuation of £4.75 per share. CSN and Corus had previously discussed a merger in 2002, cancelled late 2002; CSN's iron ore assets would provide synergy with Corus's need to import ore.

Subsequently, Tata submitted an improved bid at £5.00 per share, followed by an improved bid from CSN at £5.15 per share which was accepted by the board of Corus on 11 December 2006. On 19 December 2006, the UK body, the Panel on Takeovers and Mergers announced a close date for bidding of 30 January 2007.

In late January, an auction was held by the Panel for Corus's shares, with Tata outbidding CSN at £6.08 vs £6.03 per share. CSN's bid had been supported by Goldman Sachs whilst Tata's was supported by ABN Amro, Rothschilds, and Deutsche Bank.

=== 2007–2014 ===
In January 2009, Corus announced job cuts of 1,000 in the Netherlands and 2,500 in the UK due to the economic downturn (see Great Recession) and consequent reduction of steel demand. Cuts included cessation (mothballing) of production at a hot strip mill in Llanwern, Wales (600 jobs), as well as major jobs losses (up to 700) at the engineering steel production site in Rotherham. Corus also closed down its defined benefit pension scheme to new members.

In late 2009, Corus announced the mothballing of the Teesside Cast Products plant (Teesside blast furnaces), following the unexpected cancellation of 10 year contracts with Marcegaglia (Italy) signed 2004. Corus's workforce was expected to be reduced by approximately 1,700 as a result; The plant had been identified as surplus to requirements in 2003, with Corus's own steel requirements to be supplied from Port Talbot and Scunthorpe, with Teesside Cast Products to seek external markets for its steel slab. Partial mothballing took place in early 2010. In mid 2010 the company reached preliminary agreement to sell the plant to Thai steel producer SSI. The plant was sold in February 2011 for £300 million.

In September 2010, Corus announced that it was changing its name to Tata Steel Europe and adopting the Tata logo.

In July 2012, Tata Steel were fined £500,000 over the 2006 death of worker Kevin Downey at their Port Talbot plant. Engulfed in steam and left disorientated during a night shift, Downey died after wandering into a channel of molten slag heated to 1,500 °C.

On 23 November 2012, Tata Steel Europe announced that, as a result of restructuring proposals, there would be a net loss of 900 jobs in the UK.

=== 2014–2020 ===
By late 2014, Tata Group remained £13 billion in debt, which had increased following the acquisition of Corus in 2007, due to reduced demand in Europe (see 2008 financial crisis and the Great Recession). As a result, the company sought to reduce liabilities: the European long products division was offered in sale to Klesch Group. The long products division employed around 6,500, and was operating at about 60% of its 5 million ton pa capacity; the division included primary production at Scunthorpe Steelworks; mills in Teesside (Teesside Beam Mill, Skinningrove and Darlington special profiles); France (Hayange rail mill); Scotland (Dalzell and Clydebridge), and other assets including the Immingham Bulk Terminal. In late 2014 estimates for the value of the property were about $1.4 billion. In August 2015 talks on the acquisition ended unsuccessfully, with Klesch citing energy prices and (dumping of) Chinese steel imports as factors against the sale.

In October 2015, the Dalzell and Clydebridge plants were announced to be mothballed, The mothballing in Scotland and further reductions at Scunthorpe (around 900 jobs) led to 1,200 redundancies in late 2015. In late 2015 Tata Steel UK reached a preliminary agreement with Greybull Capital for it to acquire Tata's European long products division, excluding the Dalzell and Clydebridge plants.

In early 2016, CEO Karl Koehler stood down to be replaced by CTO Hans Fischer.

In March 2016, The Sunday Post report that a preliminary agreement had been reached between Tata and Liberty House Group on the sale of the Dalzell and Clydesbridge plants.

In late March 2016, the Tata board rejected a turnaround plan for the Port Talbot site, and announced it would seek to sell all (or part) of its UK steel business. Its UK steel operations had lost £68 million in the three months to February 2016, from a profit the previous year despite rising demand – a primary factor in the loss was lowered steel prices due to global imports, with Russia, South Korea and particularly China cited as dumping steel. Other factors mitigating against profitability included high energy costs (including green taxes), high business rates and oversupply/low demand. In addition the UK government had voted against increased tariffs on imported Chinese steel due to its free trade policies, limiting import duties to minimal amounts (around 10%). – The Daily Telegraph reported that the UK Government's failure to back EU attempts to increase anti-dumping measure on imported steel had been the tipping point in Tata's decision to exit the UK steel business.

After a successful turnaround of the Long Products division led by Bimlendra Jha (executive chairman of Tata's European Long's business), the sale to Greybull Capital for a nominal £1 was agreed on 11 April 2016, with Greybull taking over assets and liabilities of the division. On completion of the sale Greybull was to rename the business "British Steel". At takeover the division employed approximately 5,000 persons, predominately in the UK. The sale was completed end of May 2016.

Tata set a deadline of 28 May 2016 for bids for its remaining UK business. Liberty House confirmed it was to bid for Tata's remaining UK assets, and a management backed buyout, named Excalibur UK also submitted a bid. In early May 2016 Tata stated it was considering offers from seven bidders for the whole UK business, taking forward only bids for the whole of the business. Other bidders were rumoured to be JSW Steel (India), Nucor (US), Hebei Iron & Steel Group (China), ThyssenKrupp (Germany), private equity fund Endless LLP (UK), and Greybull Capital. Wilbur Ross (USA) was also rumoured to be a late bidder for the assets.

In early July 2016, Tata paused the sale procedure in part to assess the effect of the vote to leave the EU (Brexit) in the UK EU membership referendum of 2016; on 8 July it announced it was in discussion with other steelmakers, specifically ThyssenKrupp on the formation of a joint venture between their respective European steel businesses. JSW Steel and Hebei Iron & Steel were also reported as potential joint venture partners. In addition to the talks on a joint venture the company was also stated to be in talks to sell the pipe (Hartlepool) and EAF/speciality steel (South Yorkshire) businesses separately.

In November 2016, Tata and Liberty House signed a letter of intent on the sale of Tata's speciality steel business (Rotherham, Stocksbridge, Brinsworth) for £100 million. This sale was completed in February 2017 to form Liberty Speciality Steels and included the Wednesbury bright bar division and Hartlepool tubes division.

In December 2016, Tata made commitments to: invest £1 billion over ten years into its British operations, and continue operating two blast furnaces at Port Talbot for at least 5 years; as well as promising to avoid compulsory redundancies in the next five years; at the same time an agreement was announced between unions and Tata leading to the closure of a defined benefit pension scheme.

In September 2017, Tata Steel Ltd reached an agreement to merge its European steel business with the German steel manufacturer ThyssenKrupp to form a joint venture headquartered in Amsterdam. The agreement was later abandoned after the European Commission indicated it would not approve the venture.

=== Present: Company liquidation ===
In November 2020, Tata Steel Limited (the parent company) announced its plan to separate the European operations into two entities, one based in the UK and one in the Netherlands. In October 2021, Tata Steel Europe was officially split into a British and a Dutch branch; creating stand alone businesses in the Netherlands (Tata Steel Netherlands) and the UK (Tata Steel UK). The branches fall directly under Tata Steel as Tata Steel Europe as a company ceased to exist after the break up of European business. The split was a historic moment, after 22 years of the British-Dutch collaboration in the steel company. Tata Steel IJmuiden aims to make the company more sustainable, and was pressured to do so by the Dutch government and society. The British branch has been heavily loss-making for years, which was holding down the Dutch branch into fulfilling these plans.

== Operations ==
=== Blast furnaces ===
At the beginning of 2016 Tata Steel Europe had three blast furnaces based steelmaking facilities; the long products division was sold in April 2016 including the Scunthorpe Steelworks.

- Port Talbot, Wales (Port Talbot Steelworks) – slab, hot and cold rolled coil, galvanised coil
- Tata Steel IJmuiden, Netherlands (former Koninklijke Hoogovens) – hot and cold rolled coil, galvanised and colour coated coil and tinplate

=== Steel mills ===
It also had rolling mills and steel product manufacturing sites situated at:

Flat products

- Shotton, Wales – galvanised and (plastic) coated sheet
- Ivôz-Ramet nr Liège, Belgium – galvanised and (plastic) coated sheet
- Trostre, South Wales (Trostre Steelworks) – Tinplate and packaging steels
- Duffel, Belgium – polymer coated packaging steel Protact
- Louvroil, Maubeuge, France – colour coated coil
- Adapazarı, Turkey – colour coated coil
- Llanwern, Wales (Llanwern steelworks) – hot and cold rolled strip/coil, galvanised coil
- Düsseldorf and Trier, Germany – electroplated strip
- Warren, Ohio and Bethlehem, Pennsylvania, United States – electroplated strip
- Durango, Spain (Layde works) – narrow strip
- Walsall, England – coated narrow strip

Tube

- Corby, England – tube
- Maastricht, Netherlands – tube
- Oosterhout, Netherlands – tube
- Zwijndrecht, Netherlands – tube

Other

- Wednesbury, England – bright bar
- Tata Steel Europe produce electrical steels via their subsidiary Cogent Power. Grain-orientated sheet at Orb Works, Newport, South Wales; and non-grain orientated sheet at Surahammar, Sweden; a finishing works in Burlington, Ontario, Canada.

=== Former operations ===
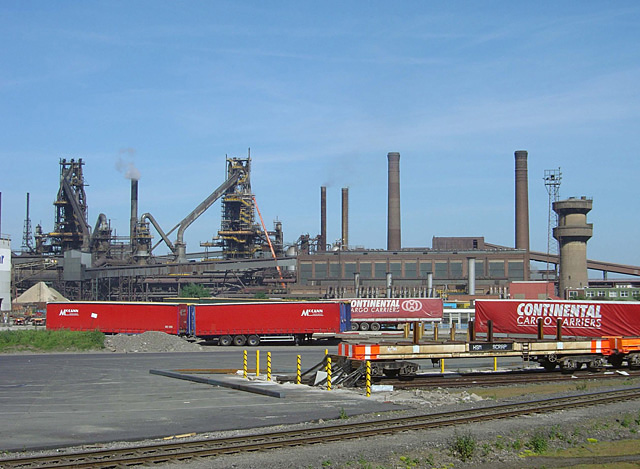
Scunthorpe Steelworks

- Ravenscraig steelworks, at Motherwell, slab, hot and cold rolled products, part of British Steel from 1967 until its closure in 1992.
- Teesside Cast Products, blast furnaces at Lackenby, Redcar, North Yorkshire, UK – mothballed 2010, sold 2011 to SSI, closed c. 2014
- Dalzell Works and Clydebridge Works, at Motherwell, Scotland, steel plate – mothballed 2015, sold to Liberty House 2016
- Aluminium division – primary production sold to Aleris 2006
- Ebbw Vale Steelworks, integrated steel mill located in Ebbw Vale, South Wales. Iron and steel making ceased in the 1970s and redeveloped as a specialised tinplate works. Formerly owned by Richard Thomas & Baldwins, part of British Steel and latterly Corus. Closed by Corus in 2002.
- Long product division – sold to Greybull Capital 2016, forming British Steel Limited
  - Scunthorpe Steelworks, England – primary blast furnace based production – bloom, billet, slab, rail, wire, rod and plate
  - Teesside, England (Teesside Beam Mill) – heavy sections
  - Skinningrove Steelworks, England – special sections
  - Former Sogerail plant, Hayange, France – railway rails
- Rotherham Engineering Steels and Narrow Strip – sold February 2017 to Liberty House Group along with the Stocksbridge rolling mill

== See also ==
- Tata Steel Chess Tournament—Sponsor
