= Scoria brick =

Iron slag brick

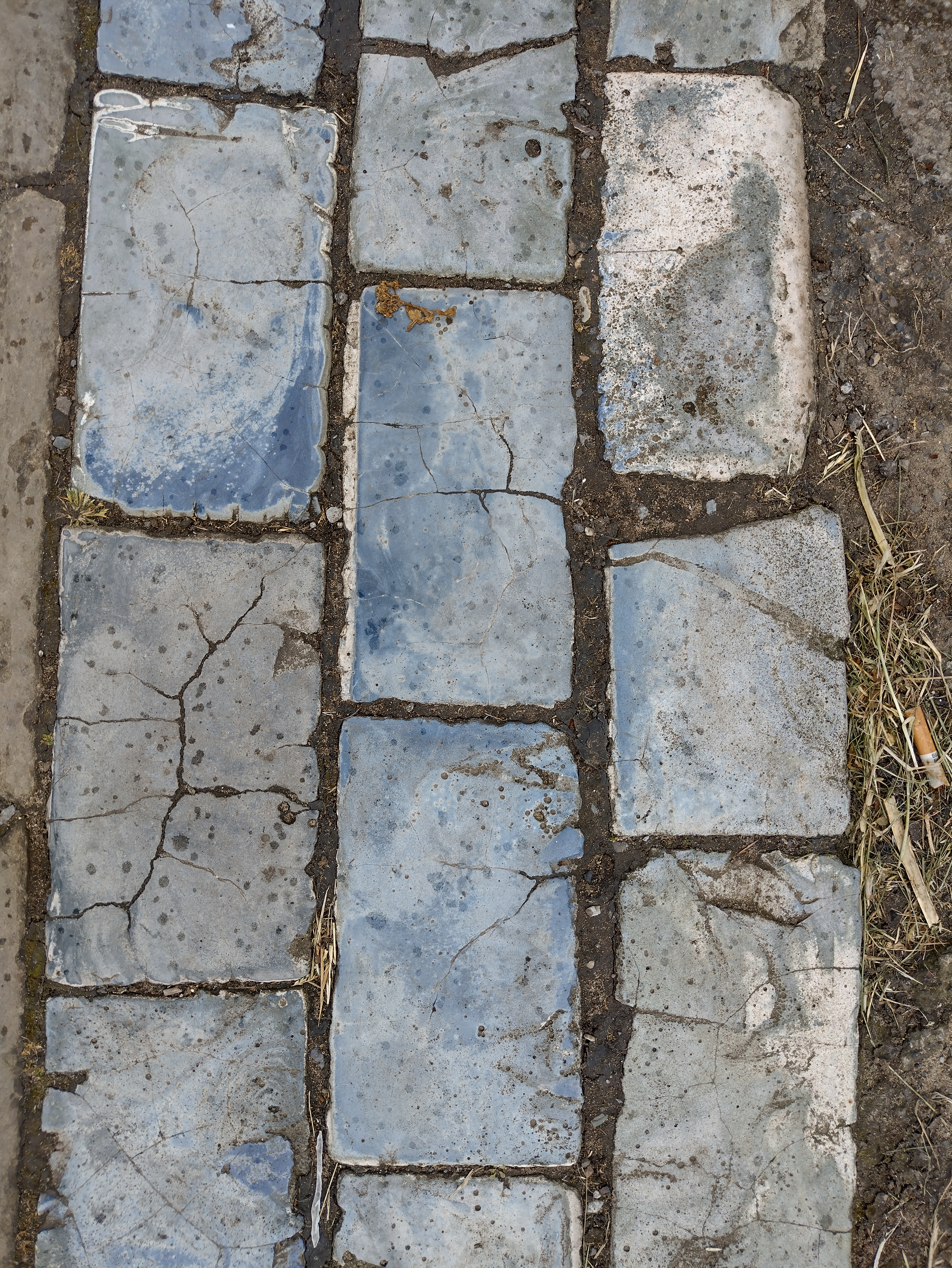
Scoria bricks in Whitby

Scoria brick (Note: Sometimes spelled Scoriæ or Scoriae) is a type of blue-grey brick made from slag, originally manufactured from the waste of the steelworks of Teesside, common across the North-East of England. The bricks were also exported around the world and can be found in Canada, West Indies, Netherlands, Belgium, United States, India and South America.

The word Scoria originally comes from Greek, meaning "Excrement", but came to be used by the Romans for a kind of volcanic rock. The bricks were invented by Darlington industrialist Joseph Woodward, in the 1870s, with him registering a patent in 1873 and forming the "Tees Scoriae Company" the same year. At its peak the company was taking 30% of the slag from the South-Tees works.

The bricks were produced by pouring the slag cauldrons, coming on trains from the steel works, into moulds made with hinged bottoms and mounted on a revolving platform allowing the moulds to be filled separately. As the bricks solidified they were removed and placed in a beehive oven, where the residual heat annealed the whole of the brick. The bricks were found to be extremely durable against water, frost, chemicals and heavy loads, which led to them being used as a road surface. On the other hand, an early trial of the bricks in Liverpool found the bricks to wear unevenly and become slippery in wet conditions.
