= Iron and Steel Corporation of Great Britain =

British nationalised industry

The Iron and Steel Corporation of Great Britain was a nationalised industry, set up in 1949 by Clement Attlee's Labour government.

The Iron and Steel Act 1949 took effect on 15 February 1951, the Corporation becoming the sole shareholder of 80 of the principal iron and steel companies (reduced from the 107 proposed in the first draft of the Bill). The model differed from previous nationalisations in that it was the share capital of the companies that was acquired, not their undertakings. The reason was that companies in the iron and steel industry had wide-ranging ancillary activities, from which the core business of iron and steel making could not easily be extracted. Firms whose chief activity was manufacture of motor vehicles were specifically excluded from the scheme. Companies not qualifying for acquisition were required to have a licence to produce more than 5,000 tons of ore or other products. Some 2,000 iron and steel companies remained in business outside the nationalised sector.

Nationalisation of steel production was strongly resisted by the Conservative opposition. On returning to power, they instructed the Corporation to make no change to the structure of the industry and made plans instead for its return to the private sector.

The Corporation was superseded by the Iron and Steel Holding and Realisation Agency. The Agency succeeded in selling all of the nationalised companies with the exception of the largest, Richard Thomas and Baldwins. This remained in public ownership and was absorbed into the British Steel Corporation when the industry was re-nationalised by the Labour government of Harold Wilson in 1967.

== See also ==
- Iron and Steel Board

== Sources ==
- Whitaker's Almanack (various dates)
