= Long steel products =

Industrial good

In steel industry terminology, long steel products or long products are steel products including wire, rod, rail, and bars as well as types of steel structural sections and girders.

The term long products may include hot rolled bar, cold rolled or drawn bar, rebar, railway rails, wire, rope (stranded wire), woven cloth of steel wire, shapes (sections) such as U, I, or H sections, and may also include ingots from continuous casting, including blooms and billets. Fabricated structural units, such bridge sections are also classed as long products. The definition excludes "flat products" — slab, plate, strip and coil, tinplate, and electrical steel — and also excludes certain tubular products including seamless and welded tube.

Long products find general use in construction industries, and in capital goods sectors.
