= British Steel (1967–1999) =

Steelmaking enterprise in the United Kingdom

British Steel plc
- Industry: Steel
- Founded: 1967; 59 years ago
- Defunct: 6 October 1999
- Fate: Merger
- Successor: Corus

British Steel was a major British steel producer. Originally created as the nationalised British Steel Corporation (BSC), it was privatised and thus became a public limited company, British Steel plc, in 1988. It was once a constituent of the FTSE 100 Index. The company merged with Koninklijke Hoogovens to form Corus Group in 1999.

Britain's steel industry was re-nationalised on 28 July 1967 under a Labour government headed by Harold Wilson, creating BSC. At the time of formation, BSC comprised around ninety per cent of the UK's steelmaking capacity; it had around 268,500 employees and roughly 200 subsidiaries. However, by this point, 20 years of political manipulation had left companies, such as British Steel, with serious problems: a complacency with existing equipment, plants operating below full capacity (resulting in persistently low efficiency), poor-quality assets, outdated technology, government price controls, higher coal and oil costs, lack of funds for capital improvement, and increasing competition on the world market. By the 1970s, the Labour government's main goal for the declining industry was to keep employment high. Since British Steel was a major employer in depressed regions, it was decided to keep many mills and facilities operating at a loss.

During the 1980s, Conservative Prime Minister Margaret Thatcher re-privatised BSC as British Steel. Under private control, the company dramatically cut its workforce and underwent a radical reorganisation and massive capital investment to again become competitive in the world marketplace, this included the end of steelmaking in Scotland. By 1991, the workforce totalled 55,000. Following regulatory approval, British Steel merged with Koninklijke Hoogovens in 1999 then, as Corus Group, was taken over by the Indian steel operator Tata Steel in 2007.

== History ==
=== Background ===
The Labour Party came to power at the 1945 general election, pledging to bring several industries into state ownership. In 1946, it put the first steel development plan into practice with the aim of increasing capacity; it also passed the Iron and Steel Act 1949, which enacted the nationalisation of the industry via the government buying out the shareholders, and the creation of the Iron and Steel Corporation of Great Britain. American Marshall Plan aid in 1948–50 reinforced modernisation efforts by providing the funding to enact them. However, the steel industry's nationalisation was reversed by the Conservative government after 1952.

According to a study conducted by Professor Alasdair M. Blair, entrepreneurship across British steel makers was generally lacking in the 1940s; the British government could not persuade the industry to upgrade its plants. For generations, the industry had followed a piecemeal growth pattern that proved relatively inefficient in the face of world competition.

=== Nationalisation ===
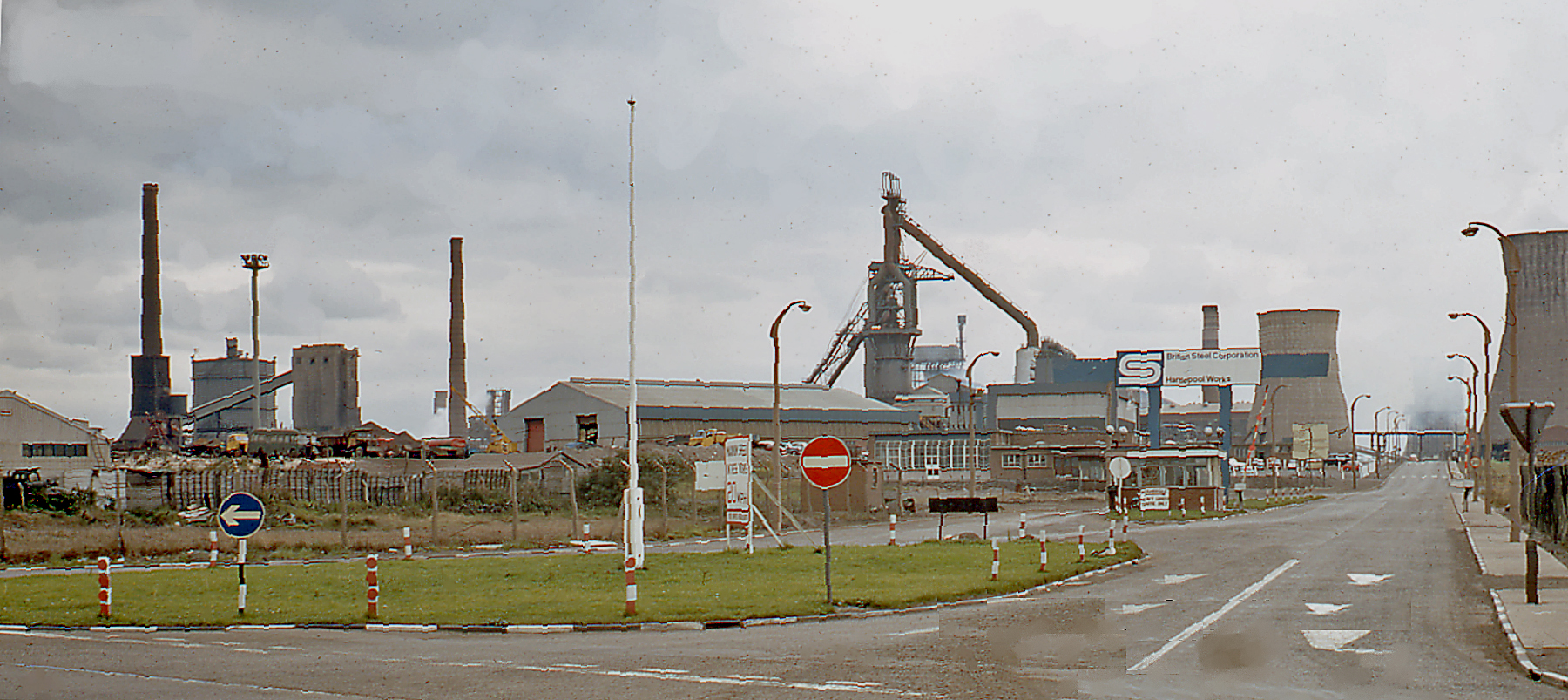
British Steel Hartlepool Works, formerly South Durham Steel & Iron Company, in 1970

BSC was formed from the assets of former private companies which had been nationalised, largely under the Labour government of Harold Wilson, on 28 July 1967. It was established under the Iron and Steel Act 1967, which vested in the corporation the shares of the fourteen major UK-based steel companies then in operation, being:

- David Colville & Sons;
- Consett Iron Company Ltd;
- Dorman Long & Company Ltd;
- English Steel Corporation Ltd;
- GKN Steel Company Ltd;
- John Summers & Sons Ltd;
- The Lancashire Steel Corporation Ltd;
- The Park Gate Iron and Steel Company Ltd;
- Richard Thomas and Baldwins Ltd;
- Round Oak Steelworks Ltd;
- South Durham Steel & Iron Company Ltd;
- The Steel Company of Wales Ltd;
- Stewarts & Lloyds, Ltd; and
- The United Steel Companies Ltd.

At the time of its formation, BSC comprised around ninety per cent of the UK's steelmaking capacity; it had around 268,500 employees and around 200 wholly or partly-owned subsidiaries based in the United Kingdom, Australia, New Zealand, Canada, Africa, South Asia, and South America.

The British Iron and Steel Research Association (BISRA) was absorbed into BSC, although it continued to operate under its independent brand for several years thereafter. BISRA would produce new innovations, such as the spray steelmaking process, and work with BSC to commercialise it.

Dorman Long, South Durham and Stewarts and Lloyds had merged as British Steel and Tube Ltd before vesting took place. BSC later arranged an exchange deal with Guest, Keen and Nettlefolds Ltd (GKN), the parent company of GKN Steel, under which BSC acquired Dowlais Ironworks at Merthyr Tydfil and GKN took over BSC's Brymbo Steelworks near Wrexham.

=== Restructuring ===
It was clear that, even prior to nationalisation, considerable changes were needed. International competition had considerably intensified during the 1960s, and this highly competitive environment persisted during the 1970s, compelling change. Furthermore, British Steel faced multiple serious internal problems at the time of its formation, including obsolescent plants; plants operating under capacity and thus at low efficiency; outdated technology; price controls that reduced marketing flexibility; soaring coal and oil costs; and a lack of capital investment funds. Accordingly, in August 1978, BSC agreed terms with the trades union congress for the concept of closure procedures. By the 1970s, the government adopted a policy of keeping employment high in the declining industry; this move especially impacted BSC since it was a major employer in a number of depressed regions.

In 1974, it was observed of BSC that too little steel was being produced across too many locations and involving too many employees, which necessitated rationalisation and restructuring of the corporation's operations. Specifically, production would be centred around fewer locations, declining from 30 works in 1970 to six major sites in 1980. In turn, this move would involve BSC's total labour force being drastically slashed from 260,000 to 80,000, potentially resulting in the withdrawal of up to 40 per cent of all the jobs for men in the manufacturing sector in certain communities. In 1974, BSC was the second largest steel producer in the western world, producing approximately 24 million tonnes of steel, as well as being Britain’s fourth largest employer (225,000), and was engaged in a £3 billion capital expenditure programme aimed at increasing output to 36-38 million tonnes per annum and reducing its headcount to approximately 180,000 employees.

One of the arguments made in favour of nationalisation was that it would enable steel production to be rationalised. This involved concentrating investment on major integrated plants, placed near the coast for ease of access by sea, and closing older, smaller plants, especially those that had been located inland for proximity to coal supplies. Accordingly, from the mid-1970s, BSC pursued a strategy of concentrating steelmaking in five areas: South Wales, South Yorkshire, Scunthorpe, Teesside and Scotland. This policy continued following the Conservative victory at the 1979 general election. Other traditional steelmaking areas faced cutbacks. Under the Labour government of James Callaghan, a review by Lord Beswick had led to the reprieve of the so-called 'Beswick plants', for social reasons, but subsequent governments were obliged under EU rules to withdraw subsidies. Major changes resulted across Europe, including in the UK:

- At Consett, the closure of the BSC works in 1980 marked the end of steel production in Derwent Valley and the sharp decline of the area.
- At Corby, the closure of the former Stewarts & Lloyds site in the early-1980s saw the loss of 11,000 jobs, leading to an initial unemployment rate of over 30 percent.
- In Wales, the closure of the works at East Moors (Cardiff) in 1978.
- Shotton closure of the heavy end with the loss of over 6,000 jobs.
- In Scotland, Western Europe's largest hot strip steel mill, Ravenscraig steelworks, near Motherwell, North Lanarkshire, was closed by British Steel in 1992, leading to high levels of unemployment in the area. It also led to the closure of several local support and satellite businesses, such as the nearby British Steel Clydesdale Works in Mossend, Clyde Alloy in Netherton and equipment maker Anderson Strathclyde. Demolition of the site's landmark blue gasometer in 1996, and the subsequent clean-up operation, has created the largest brownfield site in Europe. This huge area between Motherwell and Wishaw is in line to be transformed into the new town of Ravenscraig, a project partly funded by Corus.

By 1980, there was industry-wide overcapacity, the negative effects of this being only compounded by rising energy prices and a deepening recession. That year, steel workers held their first national strike for more than 50 years over pay and the threat of plant closures. Total employment across Britain's steel sector almost halved between 1979 and 1981, falling from 156,600 to 88,200.

=== Privatisation ===
The Conservative manifesto for the 1987 general election noted that "British Steel has more than doubled its productivity since 1979 and made a profit last year for the first time in over ten years."

We will continue the successful programme of privatisation.

— Conservative Manifesto, 1987

Following Margaret Thatcher's re-election, on 3 December 1987, the Conservative government formally announced in a statement by Kenneth Clarke, Minister of State for Trade and Industry, that it intended to privatise the British Steel Corporation.

… the Government are committed to returning successful state industries such as steel to the private sector as soon as practicable. It is quite apparent that the British Steel Corporation has now reached the stage where it would benefit from a return to a fully commercial environment. I am therefore pleased to announce that I am setting in hand the work necessary to privatise the corporation as soon as possible, subject to market conditions.

[…]

I believe that early privatisation and full commercial freedom will enable the company and its work force to be best placed to go on to further achievements and to secure a firmly based competitive industry with a long-term future.

— Kenneth Clarke, Minister of State for Trade and Industry

British Steel Act 1988 (Note: Section 17(1).)
- Act of Parliament
- Parliament of the United Kingdom
- Long title: An Act to provide for the vesting of the property, rights and liabilities of the British Steel Corporation in a company nominated by the Secretary of State and for the subsequent dissolution of the Corporation; and for connected purposes.
- Citation: 1988 c. 35
- Territorial extent: England and Wales; Scotland; Northern Ireland (in part); (Note: Section 17(5)–(6).)

Dates
- Royal assent: 29 July 1988
- Commencement: 29 July 1988 (sections 2 and 15(1).; 5 September 1988 (rest of act); (Note: Section 17(2)–(4). The British Steel Act 1988 (Appointed Day) Order 1988 (SI 1988/1375).)
Other legislation
Amends	Tribunals and Inquiries Act 1971; Local Government, Planning and Land Act 1980; Iron and Steel Act 1982; Miscellaneous Financial Provisions Act 1983; Mineral Workings Act 1985
Amended by	Taxation of Chargeable Gains Act 1992; Finance Act 1996; Statute Law (Repeals) Act 2004; Companies Act 2006 (Consequential Amendments etc) Order 2008; Corporation Tax Act 2009; Deregulation Act 2015

Status: Amended

Text of statute as originally enacted

Text of the British Steel Act 1988 as in force today (including any amendments) within the United Kingdom, from legislation.gov.uk.

On 5 September 1988 the assets, rights and liabilities of British Steel Corporation were transferred to British Steel plc, registered under the Companies Act 1985 as company number 2280000, by the British Steel Act 1988 (c. 35).

The government retained a special share which carried no voting rights but until 31 December 1993, permitted the government to stop any one party controlling more than 15% of the shares.

British Steel employees were given a free allocation of shares, and offered two free shares for each they purchased up to £165, discounted shares up to £2,200, and priority on applying for shares up to £10,000. The open trading of shares on the London Stock Exchange commenced on 5 December 1988.

=== Post-privatisation ===
For the 1989-1990 financial year, British Steel recorded a pre-tax profit of £733 million; at the time, the workforce totalled 55,000. Domestic demand for steel declined during the early 1990s, contributing to the closure of Ravenscraig steelworks, which ended steelmaking in Scotland. British Steel's decision to close its works at Ravenscraig, rather than mothball or seek a buyer, generated some political controversy.

In June 1999, British Steel and the Dutch steel producer Koninklijke Hoogovens announced their intention to merge, which would make the combined company—provisionally named BSKH—the world's third-largest steel producer with an aggregate worldwide turnover of approximately €15.127 billion. Upon completion, Hoogovens shareholders would own 38.3% of the new company. Because of the size of the two companies, and the extent of their competition within the European Economic Community, the merger required the approval of the Commission of the European Communities; this was granted in mid-July of the same year, and on 6 October 1999 the merger was completed. The new name for the joint company, Corus Group, had been announced the month before.

Because British Steel had been the significantly larger of the two companies in both workforce and market capitalisation, some observers characterised the merger as being more akin to a takeover of Hoogovens by British Steel. Analysts noted that expanding its market share in Europe by means of the merger would help insulate British Steel against the strength of the sterling relative to the euro, which had been harming British Steel's exports.

Corus itself was taken over in March 2007 by the Indian steel operator Tata Steel.

== Chairmen ==
- Julian Mond, 3rd Baron Melchett (1967–1973)
- Monty Finniston (1973–1976)
- Charles Villiers (1976–1980)
- Ian MacGregor (1980–1983)
- Robert Haslam (1983–1986)
- Robert Scholey (1986–1992)
- Sir Brian Moffat (1992–1999)

Ian MacGregor later became famous for his role as Chairman of the National Coal Board during the UK miners' strike (1984–1985). During the strike, the "Battle of Orgreave" took place at British Steel's coking plant.

== Sponsorships ==
In 1971, British Steel sponsored Sir Chay Blyth in his record-making non-stop circumnavigation against the winds and currents, known as 'The Impossible Voyage'. In 1992 they sponsored the British Steel Challenge, the first of a series of 'wrong way' races for amateur crews.

British Steel had agreed a sponsorship deal with Middlesbrough Football Club during the 1994–95 season, with a view to British Steel-sponsored Middlesbrough shirts making their appearance the following season. But the sponsorship deal was terminated before it commenced after it was revealed that British steel only made up a tiny fraction of steel used in construction of the stadium, and that the bulk of the steel had been imported from Germany.

== In popular culture ==
The English rock band XTC mentioned British Steel in their 1979 song Making Plans for Nigel.

The heavy metal band Judas Priest named their 1980 album British Steel after the British Steel Corporation. Lead singer Rob Halford said the 'sounds of heavy metal' had been with him since childhood, as he grew up close to a BSC plant.

== See also ==
- British Iron and Steel Research Association
