= List of Sephardic Jews =

The following is a list of Sephardic Jews. See also List of Iberian Jews.

This is a list of notable Jews of Sephardic ancestry.

== A ==
- Isaac Abravanel (1437-1508), Portuguese-born Spanish philosopher, rabbi, economist and Orthodox Jewish theologist.
- José Aboulker (1920-2009), French resistance fighter and neurosurgeon.
- Senor Abravanel (1930-2024), Brazilian businessman, media tycoon and television host. Direct descendant of Isaac Abravanel.
- Abraham Amigo (1610-1683), Israeli rabbi of Sepharadi descent
- Benjamin Artom (1835-1879), Haham of the Spanish and Portuguese Jews of Great Britain
- Lior Ashkenazi (1969-), Israeli actor
- Ben Ashkenazy (1968/69-), American billionaire real estate developer
- Moran Atias (1981-), Israeli-American actress
- Jacques Attali (1943-), Algerian-born French economist, advisor to President François Mitterrand from 1981 to 1991
- Hank Azaria (1964-) American actor, known for voicing many characters in the long-running animated series The Simpsons
- Max Azria (1949-2019) Tunisian-born American fashion designer

== B ==
- Pini Balili (1979), Israeli former footballer
- Yossi Benayoun (1980-), Israeli former footballer
- Fabrice Benichou (1965-), French world champion boxer
- Judah P. Benjamin (1811-1884), American politician and statesman
- Aldo Bensadoun (1939-), Canadian businessman, founder of the ALDO Group
- Georges Bensoussan (1952-), French historian
- Maurice Berger, cultural historian, art critic, curator (Sephardic mother; father Ashkenazi Jew)
- John Berman (1972-), news anchor for CNN.
- Miri Bohadana (1977-), Israeli actress, model, and presenter
- Can Bonomo (1987-), Turkish singer
- Alain de Botton (1969-), Swiss writer and philosopher (Sephardi father, Ashkenazi mother)
- Alain Boublil (1941-), Tunisian-born French lyricist of the musical Les Misérables
- Michel Boujenah (1952-), French comedian and actor
- Albert Bourla (1961-), Greek-born CEO of Pfizer
- Caryl Brahms (1901-1982), British writer
- Dany Brillant (1965-), Tunisian-born French singer and actor
- June Brown (1927-2022), British actress
- Patrick Bruel (1959-), French singer and actor
- Tony Bullimore (1939-2018), British yachtsman

== C ==
- Neve Campbell (1973-), Canadian film and television actress (Scream)
- David Samuel Carasso, 19th-century traveler and writer
- Isaac (1874-1939) and Daniel Carasso (1905-2009), founders of Danone
- Benjamin N. Cardozo (1870-1938), Supreme Court Justice
- Gabrielle Carteris (1961-), American actress best known for her role in the TV series 90210
- Omri Casspi (1988-), Israeli NBA player
- Jacob Castello, 17th-century poet
- Joseph Cayre (1941-), co-founder of record label Salsoul Records, video tape distributor and producer GoodTimes Entertainment, and video game publisher GT Interactive
- Stanley Chera (1942-2020), American real estate developer
- Joseph Chetrit (1957-), American real estate investor and developer and founder of the Chetrit Group
- Élie Chouraqui (1957-), French Israeli film director
- Emmanuelle Chriqui (1975-), Canadian actress
- Hélène Cixous (1937-), Algerian-born French feminist critic
- Maurice Abraham Cohen (1851-1923), educator
- Claude Cohen-Tannoudji (1933–2026), French physicist. He shared the 1997 Nobel Prize in Physics
- Jean-François Copé (1964-), French politician; former President of the Union for a Popular Movement (UMP) Group in the French National Assembly; Sephardic mother
- Oliver Jackson-Cohen (1986-), English actor, notably played Luke Crain in The Haunting of Hill House
- Uriel da Costa (1585-1640), Portuguese philosopher and Orthodox-Jew theologist

== D ==
- Jean Daniel (1920-2020), French journalist and author, founder of Le Nouvel Observateur
- Pierre Darmon (1934-), French tennis player
- Jacques Derrida (1930-2004), Algerian-born French philosopher
- Benjamin Disraeli (1804-1881), Prime Minister of the United Kingdom
- Patrick Drahi (1963-), billionaire founder of international news channel i24news
- Victor Drai (1947-), nightclub owner, entrepreneur and film producer.
- Julien Dray (1955-), Algerian-born French politician, member of the National Assembly for the Socialist Party (PS)
- Pierre Dukan (1941-), French physician, inventor of the Dukan Diet
- Solomon Dwek (1973-) former American real estate investor and convicted felon

== F ==
- Predrag Finci (1946-), Bosnian-British philosopher, author, and essayist
- Jacque Fresco (1916-2017), American futurist, industrial engineer, social designer and the founder of The Venus Project

== G ==
- Meir Shmuel Gabay (1933-2010), first and only Israeli to be elected to the United Nations General Assembly for any office
- Yakir Gabay (1966-), Israeli-born billionaire who founded Aroundtown; son of Meir Shmuel Gabay
- David Galula (1919-1967), French military officer and counterinsurgency theoretician
- Sonia Gardner (1962-), co-founder of hedge fund Avenue Capital Management
- Sonny Gindi (1924-2012), co-founder of the Century 21department store
- Eyal Golan (1971-), Israeli singer (Sephardic and Yemenite descent)
- Lewis Goldsmith (1763-1846), Anglo-French journalist and political writer
- Eydie Gormé (born Edith Gormezano, 1928–2013), American singer
- Eva Green (1980-), French actress and model
- Philip Guedalla (1889-1944), biographer
- Denis Guedj (1940-2010), French mathematician and writer
- David Guetta (1967-), French DJ (Sephardic father)

== H ==
- Joseph Hackmey, Israeli businessman and art collector
- Tzachi Halevy (1975-), Israeli actor best known for the TV series Fauda
- Alphonse Halimi (1932-2006), French world champion boxer
- Gisèle Halimi (1927-2020), French civil rights advocate and feminist
- Serge Halimi (1955-), French journalist and newspaper editor
- Eli Harari, founder of SanDisk
- Serge Haroche (1944-), French physicist
- Sir Joshua Hassan (1915-1997), Gibraltarian politician, and first Mayor and Chief Minister of Gibraltar
- Jacob Hassan (1936-2006), Spanish academic, writer, and university professor
- Daniel G. Hedaya (1940-), American actor
- Sir Basil Henriques (1890-1961), philanthropist
- Jack Hidary, technology entrepreneur and researcher
- Murray Hidary (1971-), composer, fine art photographer and entrepreneur

== J ==
- Agnès Jaoui (1964-), French actress
- Juanito (1936), French singer
- Mitchell R. Julis (1955-), co-founding partner of Los Angeles hedge fund Canyon Capital Advisors

== K ==
- Paul Kodish (1965-), British professional drummer

== L ==
- Albert Laboz, New York City real estate developer
- Marc Lasry (1959-), American billionaire financier
- Mélanie Laurent (1983-), French actress, singer, pianist, director, and screenwriter
- Emma Lazarus (1849-1887), U.S. poet, best remembered for her sonnet engraved on the Statue of Liberty
- Delia de Leon (1901-1993), British actress and disciple of Meher Baba
- Jack de Leon (1902-1956), British theatre manager, impresario and playwright
- Rita Levi-Montalcini (1909-2012), Italian physician and neurobiologist
- Bernard-Henri Lévy (1948-), French philosopher
- David Levy (1937-2024), Israeli politician, former Deputy Prime Minister, Minister of Foreign Affairs, Minister of Immigrant Absorption, Minister of Housing and Construction and as a Minister without Portfolio
- Eugene Levy (1946-) Canadian actor, known for his roles in SCTV, American Pie and Schitt's Creek
- Jackie Levy (1960-), Israeli politician and former mayor of Beit She'an
- Orly Levy (1973-), Israeli politician and former member of Yisrael Beiteinu

== M ==
- Enrico Macias (1938-), Algerian-born French singer (born Gaston Ghrenassia)
- Mickaël Madar (1968-), French football player
- Moishe Mana (1956-), Israeli-born American billionaire, real estate developer
- Shiri Maimon (1981-), Israeli singer, actress, and television personality
- Maimonides (1138-1204), Mediaeval rabbi and philosopher
- Paul Marciano (1952-), co-founder of Guess? Inc.
- Phil Margo (1942-2021), American musician, member of The Tokens
- David Mazouz (2001-), American actor best known for Gotham (TV series)
- Lea Michele (1986-), American actress best known for Glee (TV series)
- Fred Melamed (1956-), American actor and writer
- Raphael Meldola (1849-1915), British chemist and first president of the Maccabaeans
- Raphael Meldola (1754-1828), English rabbi
- Pierre Mendès France (1907-1982), French politician, Prime Minister 1954-55
- Daniel Mendoza (1764-1836), 19th-century English pugilist, prizefighter
- David Mimran, film producer and director; married to former Sports Illustrated Swimsuit model Julie Ordon; son of Jean-Claude Mimran.
- Jean Claude Mimran (1945-), French businessman & former owner of Lamborghini; father of David Mimran; brother of Patrick Mimran
- Patrick Mimran (1956-), former owner & CEO of Lamborghini; brother of Jean Claude Mimran & uncle of David Mimran
- Yosef Mizrachi (1968-), Israeli-born haredi rabbi based in Monsey, New York
- Ken Moelis (1958-), American businessman and billionaire, founder of Moelis & Company
- Frederic Mocatta (1828-1905), English philanthropist
- Amedeo Modigliani (1884-1920), Italian painter
- Moses Montefiore (1784-1885), British financier and banker, activist, philanthropist and Sheriff of London
- Jacob Levy Moreno (1889-1974), Romanian physician and social scientist, pioneer of group psychotherapy, sociometry and psychodrama
- Edgar Morin (1921-2026), French sociologist and philosopher (born Edgar Nahoum)
- Shelley Morrison (1936-2019), American actress best known for her roles Sr Sixto on The Flying Nun and Rosario Salazar on Will & Grace
- Georges Moustaki (1934-2013), French singer-songwriter

== N ==
- David Nahmad (1947-), billionaire fine art dealer
- Ezra Nahmad (1945-), billionaire art collector and dealer
- Helly Nahmad (London) (1978-), owner of Helly Nahmad London, and son of Ezra Nahmad
- Helly Nahmad (New York art collector) (1976-), owner of Helly Nahmad Gallery in New York, and son of Ezra's brother David Nahmad
- Moses ben Nahman (1194-1270), medieval Jewish scholar and rabbi
- Géraldine Nakache (1980-), French actress, director, and screenwriter

== O ==
- Jerry Orbach (1935-2004), actor best known for roles in Dirty Dancing, Beauty and the Beast, and Law & Order

== P ==
- Abraham Palacci (1809/10-1898), grand rabbi of Izmir
- Rahamim Nissim Palacci (1813-1907), grand rabbi of Izmir
- Joseph Palacci (1815-1896), rabbi of Izmir
- Charles Palache (1869-1954), American mineralogist
- Haim Palachi (1788-1868), grand rabbi of Izmir
- Samuel Pallache (1550-1616), Moroccan-Dutch envoy, corsair
- Joseph De la Penha (fl.1697), Dutch trader
- Murray Perahia (1947-), American concert pianist
- Rafi Peretz (1956-), Israeli Minister of Education
- Victor Perez (1911-1945), Tunisian boxer
- Abraham Cohen Pimentel (?-1697), Head Rabbi of the Portuguese / Spanish Synagogue of Amsterdam
- Azaria Piccio (1579-1647), Venetian
- Daniel Pinto (financier) (1966-), British-French financier
- Inês Pires, mistress of King John I of Portugal; ancestor of Dukes and Portuguese Kings of the House of Braganza and many of European royalty and nobility Principe/Prince family

== R ==
- Lior Raz (1971-), Israeli screenwriter and actor best known for starring in Fauda
- Miri Regev (1965-), Israeli MK of Likud
- Haim Revivo (1972-), Israeli former footballer
- David Ricardo (1772-1823), British political economist
- Rudy Rochman (1993-), Israeli Zionist activist
- Dani Rodrik (1957-), Turkish economist
- Daniela Ruah (1983-), Portuguese-American actress
- Aaron Russo (1943-2007), American film producer, director, and political activist

== S ==
- Elvio Sadun (1918-1974), Italian-American scientist and WWII Italian partisan
- Safdie brothers, American independent film directors
- Fortuna Safdié (1958-), Brazilian singer, composer and Ladino-Revivalist.
- Haym Salomon (1740-1785), Polish-born American businessman who helped finance the American Revolutionary War
- Roberto Saviano (1979-), Italian writer
- Hugh Sebag Montefiore (1955-), British Historian and Lawyer
- Simon Sebag Montefiore (1965-), British historian
- Jerry Seinfeld (1954-), American stand-up comedian known for playing titular character in TV series Seinfeld
- Vic Seixas (1923-2024), American Hall of Fame former top-10 tennis player
- Peter Sellers (1925-1980), British comedian and actor; Knight of the Realm (Richard Henry Sellers)
- David Serero (1974-), French architect; sephardi ancestors from Morocco
- David Serero (1981-), French opera singer and actor; Sephardi ancestors from Morocco
- Silvan Shalom (1958-), former Deputy Prime Minister and Minister of Finance in Israel
- Jamie-Lynn Sigler (1981-), American actress and singer
- Joseph Sitt (1964-), founder of global real estate company Thor Equities
- Raphael Soriano (1904-1988), Rhodes-born California mid-century modern architect
- Baruch Spinoza (1632-1677), Dutch philosopher of Sephardic Portuguese origin
- Henry Stern (California politician) (1982-), California State Senator
- Dominique Strauss-Kahn (1949-), French politician; Finance Minister, 1997–99; President of the International Monetary Fund, 2007–11; Sephardic mother
- Jeff Sutton (real estate developer) (1960-), American real estate developer and billionaire

== T ==
- Alona Tal (1983-), Israeli singer and actress
- Rachamim Talbi (1943-), Israeli former footballer
- Shaun Toub (1963-), Iranian-American actor
- Isaac Touro (1738-1783), Touro College named in his honor. Touro Syn Father of Judah Touro.
- Judah Touro (1775-1854), American businessmen & philanthropist. Touro College & Touro Synagogue are named in his honor.
- Gilbert Trigano (1920-2001), French businessman, developer of Club Med

== U ==
- Uriel da Costa (c. 1585 – April 1640), Portuguese Sephardi philosopher

== V ==
- Nani Vazana (1982-), Israeli-Portuguese Singer, Trombonist and Composer and CEO of Why DIY Music

== W ==
- Len Wein (1948-2017), American comic book writer & co-creator of DC Comics' Swamp Thing and Marvel Comics' Wolverine

== Y ==
- David Levy Yulee (1810-1886), Floridian United States senator and attorney.

== Z ==
- Ahmed Zayat (1962-), owner of Thoroughbred racehorses and Triple Crown winner American Pharaoh
- Éric Zemmour (1958-), French polemist and politician

== See also ==
- List of Iberian Jews
- Sephardi Jews
- Lists of Jews
- List of Portuguese
- List of Spaniards
- Spanish Inquisition
- Portuguese Inquisition
