= Mimran =

Mimran is a surname. Notable people with the surname include:

- Jean Claude Mimran (born 1945), French businessman
- Joe Mimran (born 1952), Moroccan-Canadian fashion designer and entrepreneur
- Michel Mimran (born 1954), French architect and artist
- Patrick Mimran (born 1956), French artist and composer
