= Alpina Gstaad =

Luxury hotel in Gstaad, Switzerland

Coordinates: 46°28′32.6″N 7°17′19.1″E

The Alpina Gstaad
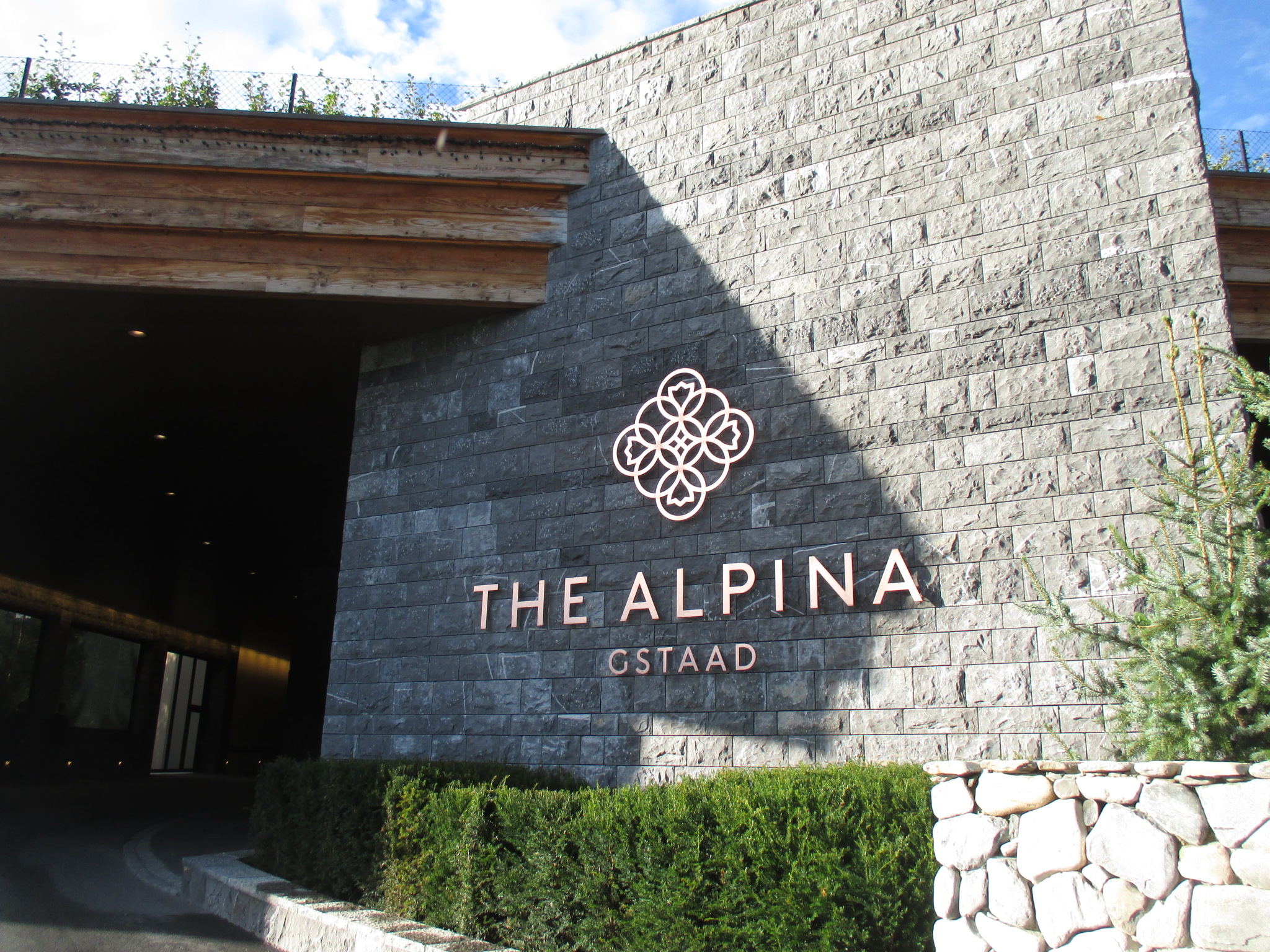
- Industry: Hospitality
- Founded: 2012
- Headquarters: Gstaad, Switzerland
- Owner: Jean Claude Mimran & Marcel Bach.
- Website: www.thealpinagstaad.ch

The Alpina Gstaad is a luxury 56-room hotel in the Oberbort area of Gstaad, Switzerland. It is owned by Jean Claude Mimran and Marcel Bach. It was opened in 2012 and was the first luxury hotel to be built in Gstaad for a century.

== Background and development ==
The hotel was built on the site of the Grand Hotel Alpina, which was demolished on April 11, 1995. Opposition from local residents to the building of a new hotel took thirteen years to overcome, and the hotel was completed and opened in late 2012. It was the first new large hotel built in Gstaad for 100 years. Local planning regulations dictated the style of the hotel, which had to be similar to the local three-storey 'Simmentaler' architectural style.

The co-owner and developer Marcel Bach sent Cristal champagne to the residents who had complained about the hotel once it had been completed. Phoebe Eaton, in an article on Gstaad in T: The New York Times Style Magazine, wrote of the hotel that "However good the Alpina and any other newcomers prove at being hotels, they are calculated real-estate plays, more about apartments and chalets for sale elsewhere on the grounds."

The hotel cost $336 million to build, an average cost of $5 million per room. The building of the hotel was completed without any debt, having been funded by the construction of three chalets and 11 apartments on the site. It was the first luxury hotel to open in Gstaad for 100 years. A third chalet was converted into apartments.

== Amenities ==
Amenities include the Six Senses spa with an 85-ft-long pool, a Japanese restaurant and a private cinema.

== Art collection ==
The Alpina Gstaad has an extensive private art collection including works by; Alex Israel, Alex Katz, Ann Carrington, Ashley Bickerton, Bosco Sodi, Carol Bove, Dan Colen, Dan McDermott, Erwan Soyer, Futura, General Idea, Henrik Olesen, Howard Schatz, Ingrid Dee Magidson, Jana Euler, John Armleder, Massimo Agostinelli, Matthew Lew, Michel Comte, Nathalie Decoster, Pamela Stretton, Patrick Bremer, Richard Aldrich, Rirkrit Tiravanija, Roy Nachum, Santiago Taccetti, Terence Koh, Tracey Emin and Bruce High Quality Foundation.

The Alpina's permanent collections include Sixty-three works by 36 artists including Dan Colen, Tracey Emin, Jana Euler, Alex Israel, Terence Koh, Henrik Olesen, General Idea and The Bruce High Quality Foundation, among many others, line the walls of the public rooms and corridors throughout The Alpina Gstaad.

Behind the reception desk – a large asymmetrical slab of polished wood hewn from a single fir tree – is a Bosco Soldi diptych of mixed media on cloth with colors and texture that recall rich fertile soil. Tracey Emin's pink neon "And I Said I Love You" sign is over the DJ area in the Lounge. The Princess by The Bruce High Quality Foundation, a silkscreen, paint on canvas of Infanta Margarita from Velásquez's Las Meninas hangs near Restaurant Sommet. Nachson Mimran, the son of Jean Claude Mimran, the hotel's majority shareholder, has been the driving force behind the art collection.

== Interior design ==
The Alpina's furniture is by B&B Italia, Lindley and Gervasoni, lighting by Pinto Paris and floor lamps by Lorenzo Tondelli. HBA designers have referenced many of the local customs and crafts from hand-painted wooden doors for the ballrooms to intricate embroidery on the armchairs. Quartz, mined from Alpine crevasses, has been transformed into bases for lamps, decanters and beer taps. The region's traditional scissor or decoupage art has been used as a design element. Glass pendant lights resemble classic Swiss cowbells. Rugs and throws are fashioned from Saanenland goat hair and columns are sheathed in saddle leather. Additionally, The Alpina Gstaad also has traditional art. Hanging from the ceiling over the main staircase is a Late Baroque painting (circa 1780) measuring 28 feet by 17 feet. Antique wooden chests and hand-painted cupboards decorate several suites.

== Awards ==
- Tripadvisor: Travellers' Choice Award 2016
- Condé Nast Traveler: Gold List 2016
- Prix Villegiature: Grand Prix – Best Resort in Europe
- Gault Millau: Hotel of the Year 2013
- European Design Awards: Hotel of the Year 2013
- Michelin Guide: one star for the Sommet restaurant
- Gault Millau: 18/20 points for the Sommet restaurant, 16/20 for MEGU restaurant
- Condé Nast Traveller: Best New Hotel in Switzerland
- Handelszeitung: Best hotel in the category: Ski-Spas de luxe – Relaxation in an altitude above 1000 meters
