= Jean Claude Mimran =

French Businessman (born 1945)

- Born: 1945 (age 80–81)
- Occupation: Businessman
- Known for: "The Sugar King of Africa"
- Spouse: 2
- Children: 5, including David Mimran
- Parent: Jacques Mimran
- Relatives: Julie Ordon (daughter-in-law)

Jean Claude Mimran (born 1945) is a French businessman with extensive agricultural interests in Senegal, and banking and industrial investments. He is the president of The Mimran Group. Mimran has two brothers, Robert and Patrick. The Swiss business magazine BILANZ has listed Mimran as one of the 300 richest people in Switzerland, with a wealth of CHF 2 billion.

== Early life ==
Mimran was born in 1945, one of three sons of Jacques Mimran, a Sephardic Jew from Morocco. His mother came from the French island of Corsica. Mimran joined his family's company after high school. He started working for his family's eponymous Mimran Group aged 18, later working at a sawmill and undergoing his French military service. After leaving the army he went to live in Africa and worked for his father's company.

== Business career ==
Mimran's father died in 1975, and the family invested in sugarcane, which provided the basis for their future wealth. Mimran now runs the Mimran Group with his brothers. Mimran has been married twice and is the father of five children, among them his sons, Nachson and David Mimran. Mimran spends two months of every year on his yacht in the Mediterranean sea.

In September 1992 Mimran and his brothers were listed by Fortune as being based in Geneva, Switzerland, and having a combined wealth of $1.5 billion. Fortune listed their wealth as having derived from "Sugar and flour production, animal feed, plastic extrusion, banking, real estate". Mimran owns 15 cars and is a collector of impressionist and post-impressionist art.

In January 1981 Mimran and his brother Patrick bought the assets of the Italian automotive manufacturer Lamborghini for $3 million. Lamborghini was sold to Chrysler Corporation in 1987.

=== Senegal ===
Mimran has been nicknamed "The Sugar King of Africa", and through the Mimran Group, is the largest flour miller and alcohol distiller in the west African region. He also has interests in raw materials handling and shipping. The Mimran Group is based in Monaco. It is the largest employer in Senegal after the country's government.

Mimran is the owner of the Compagnie Sucrière Sénégalaise (CSS) who cultivate 8,000 hectares of sugarcane in Senegal, and have more than 5,000 employees during harvest time. The operations of CSS expanded the population of the Senegalese town of Richard Toll from 2,000 to over 60,000 inhabitants.

=== Gstaad ===
Mimran is the majority owner of the Alpina Gstaad, a luxury hotel in Gstaad, Switzerland, that opened in December 2012. The 56-room hotel cost $336 million to build, an average cost of $5 million per room. The building of the hotel was completed without any debt, having been funded by the construction of chalets and apartments on the site. It was the first luxury hotel to open in Gstaad for 100 years. The minority partner in the hotel is a Swiss businessman, Marcel Bach. In 2005, with the British businessman and Formula One Executive Bernie Ecclestone, Mimran and Bach bought ski lifts and the rights to Glacier 3000, a nearby skiing area in Gstaad's neighbouring Les Diablerets district.

== Personal life ==
Mimran has 5 children with his two wives, including sons David and Nachson. David's first wife Lucy is a former fashion model, and his second wife is the Swiss model Julie Ordon. David Mimran is a film producer and founder of Mimran Schur Pictures. He has produced a number of films including Warrior, Stone, Pawn Shop Chronicles, and others. In 2015, David Mimran became the CEO of his family's Mimran Group, and the primary stakeholder in Canada's Teranga Gold.
