= Carolyn Farb =

Philanthropist and fundraiser (born 1940)

- Born: February 8, 1940 (age 86)
- Education: University of Oklahoma
- Occupations: philanthropist, fundraiser, art collector, author

Carolyn Farb (born February 8, 1940) is a philanthropist, fundraiser and art collector. She has raised more than 50 million dollars for numerous charitable causes. Farb is a resident of River Oaks, a wealthy neighborhood in Houston, Texas.

== Biography ==
As a young adult, Farb volunteered at the Texas Children's Hospital, working in the snack bar. She studied journalism at the University of Oklahoma. Farb was initially known for her marriage and subsequent divorce from the wealthy "real estate king" Harold Farb, but starting in the early 80s, she became better known for her parties and fundraisers that benefit various causes. Carolyn Farb and Harold Farb were divorced in 1983 in a suit that was reported to cost $20 million.

Farb received an honorary Doctorate in Humanities from Northwood University in 2003.

== Philanthropy ==
Farb raised more than 1 million dollars for cancer research for the Stehlin Foundation with a single gala (she is the first woman and first Texan to raise a million dollars in a single gala), helped to raise more than $3 million in one campaign for the University of Houston, and worked with other notable Houston celebrities to raise more than half a million dollars for tsunami relief.

2008 she co-chaired the Helping A Hero Gala to benefit the Wounded Hero Home Program with the Honorable and Mrs. George Strake Jr., and Houston Mayor Bill White.

== Author ==
- How to Raise Millions: Helping Others, Having a Ball by Carolyn Farb, 1993, ISBN 978-0890159248
- The Fine Art of Fundraising by Carolyn Farb, 2004, Emmis Books, ISBN 1578601800
- Lucas Comes to America by Carolyn Farb, 2011, ISBN 978-1456745417

== Art collector ==
Farb is an avid art collector whose tastes range widely from the Avant-garde to Contemporary art. She enjoys working with living artists and is often passionate about promoting their work to others. For example, she was active in working to promote the art of painter Dorothy Hood. She became interested in Hood's work in the mid-80s and helped raise money to produce the documentary, "Dorothy Hood: The Color of Life". She began collecting the multimedia work of Ingrid Dee Magidson in 2013 after seeing a unique piece at the Houston Art Fair. She has continued to collect Magidson's work, including commissioning her to create an altar.

=== Notable artists in collection ===
- Julian Schnabel
- Yigal Ozeri
- Javier Marín
- Mark Bradford
- Christopher Makos
- Edward Kienholz
- Joseph Cornell
- James Surls
- Frida Kahlo
