= Gstaad =

Town in Saanen, Bern, Switzerland

- Municipality
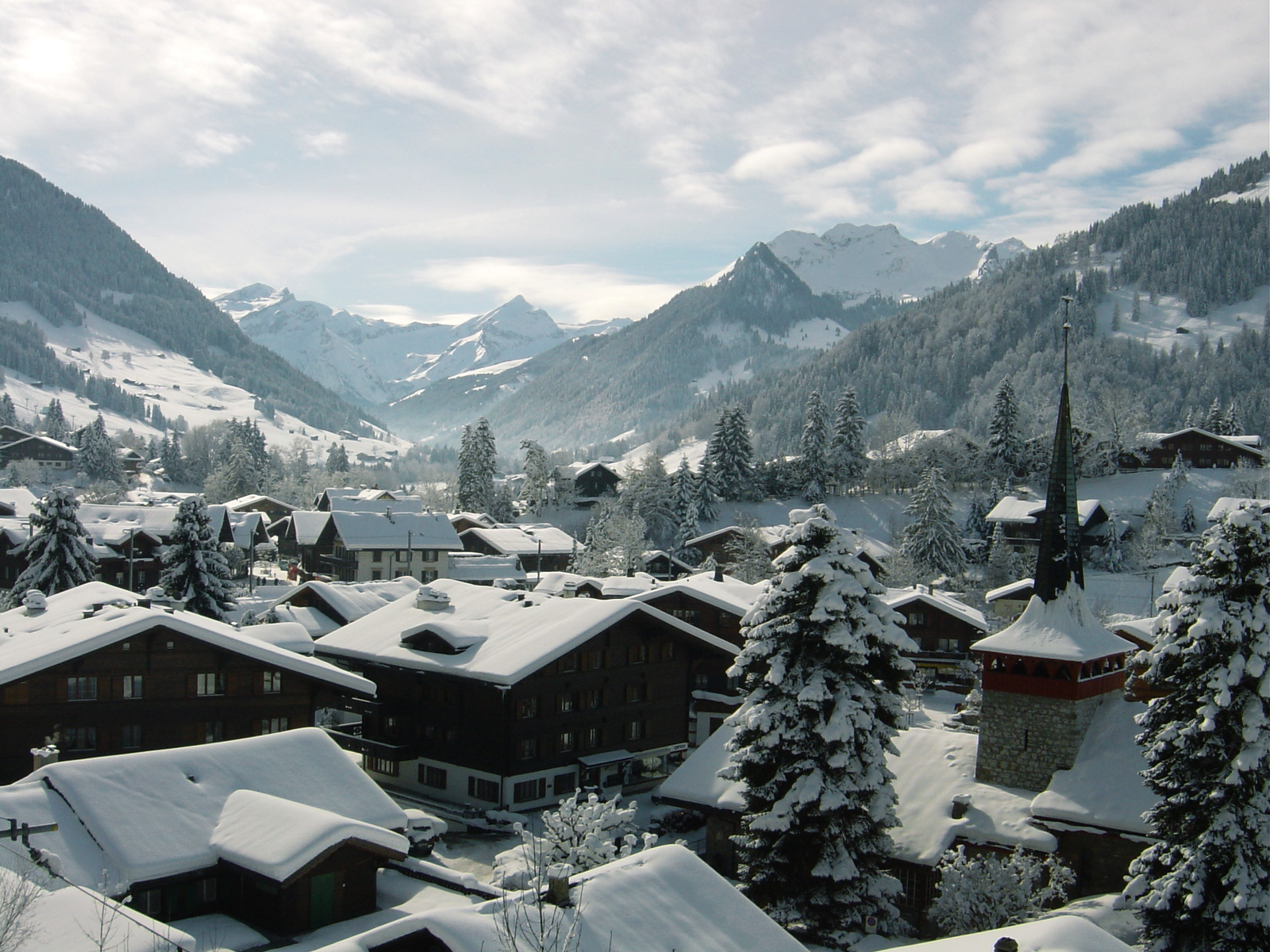
- Gstaad in 2011
- Location of Gstaad
- Location within Switzerland Location within Canton of Bern
- Coordinates: 46°28′N 7°17′E
- Country: Switzerland
- Canton: Bern
- District: Obersimmental-Saanen
- Municipality: Saanen
- Elevation: 1,050 m (3,440 ft)

Population (Dec 2009)
  - Total: 3,200
- Time zone: UTC+01:00 (CET)
  - Summer (DST): UTC+02:00 (CEST)
- Postal code: 3780
- SFOS number: 0843
- ISO 3166 code: CH-BE
- Website: https://www.saanen.ch/ SFSO statistics

Gstaad (/ɡəˈʃtɑːd, ɡəˈstɑːd/ gə-S(H)TAHD, German: [kʃtaːt]) is a town in the German-speaking section of the Canton of Bern in southwestern Switzerland. It is part of the municipality of Saanen and is known as a major ski resort and a popular destination amongst high society and the international jet set. The winter campus of the Institut Le Rosey is located in Gstaad. Gstaad has a population of about 9,200 and is located 1,050 metres (3,445 feet) above sea level.

== History ==
Aerial view (1949)

During the Middle Ages, it was part of the district of Saanen (Gessenay) belonging to the Savoyard county of Gruyère. The town core developed at the fork in the trails into the Valais and Vaud. It had an inn, a warehouse for storing trade goods and oxen to help pull wagons over the alpine passes by the 13th-14th centuries. The St. Nicholas chapel was built in the town in 1402, while the murals are from the second half of the 15th century. The town was dominated by cattle farming and agriculture until the great fire of 1898. It was then rebuilt to support the growing tourism industry. The construction of the Montreux–Lenk im Simmental line in 1905 and the construction of ski runs (the Ski Club of Saanen open in 1905, followed in 1907 by the Ski Club of Gstaad). The first ski school in Gstaad opened in 1923. The Eagle Ski Club opened in 1957, and was funded by Charles Greville, 7th Earl of Warwick. In a short time, there were more than 1,000 hotel beds in the region.

The residents, hoteliers, shopkeepers and tourist offices helped to promote Gstaad to international attention. They supported the construction of ice rinks, tennis courts, swimming pools, ski jumps, and ski and hiking areas. The first ski lifts at Funi opened in 1934-44 and were followed by a number of gondolas, ski, and chair lifts. The Gstaad Palace opened in 1913 as Gstaad's first luxury hotel. In 1942, the Saanen-Gstaad airfield was opened for military and civil aviation. Helicopter rides were added later and in 1980 balloon flights became available as well. During the World Wars and the Great Depression, the tourism industry suffered and many hotels closed. After World War II, many of the large hotels remained closed, but they were replaced with a number of smaller non-hotel accommodation (chalets, apartment houses, residences). Most of the modern resorts and small hotels are built out of wood and retain traditional design elements.

The Gstaad Polo Club was founded in 1992, and the Gstaad Yacht Club in 1998.

== Climate ==
According to the Köppen climate classification system, Gstaad has a humid continental climate, abbreviated Dfb on climate maps.

Climate data for Gstaad (1981–2010)
Month	Jan	Feb	Mar	Apr	May	Jun	Jul	Aug	Sep	Oct	Nov	Dec	Year
Mean daily maximum °C (°F)	2.9 (37.2)	4.6 (40.3)	8.5 (47.3)	12.3 (54.1)	17.3 (63.1)	20.7 (69.3)	23.3 (73.9)	22.6 (72.7)	19.0 (66.2)	14.7 (58.5)	7.8 (46.0)	3.5 (38.3)	13.1 (55.6)
Daily mean °C (°F)	−3.3 (26.1)	−2.1 (28.2)	1.9 (35.4)	5.8 (42.4)	10.4 (50.7)	13.6 (56.5)	15.7 (60.3)	15.2 (59.4)	11.8 (53.2)	7.5 (45.5)	1.4 (34.5)	−2.4 (27.7)	6.3 (43.3)
Mean daily minimum °C (°F)	−7.8 (18.0)	−7.2 (19.0)	−3.5 (25.7)	−0.1 (31.8)	4.2 (39.6)	7.0 (44.6)	9.3 (48.7)	8.9 (48.0)	5.9 (42.6)	2.3 (36.1)	−2.8 (27.0)	−6.2 (20.8)	0.8 (33.4)
Average precipitation mm (inches)	108 (4.3)	105 (4.1)	98 (3.9)	89 (3.5)	125 (4.9)	151 (5.9)	143 (5.6)	144 (5.7)	104 (4.1)	98 (3.9)	98 (3.9)	118 (4.6)	1,382 (54.4)
Average precipitation days (≥ 1.0 mm)	10.8	9.9	11.9	11.2	14.4	13.9	12.8	13.0	10.5	10.5	10.4	11.3	140.6
Source: MeteoSwiss

== Tourism ==
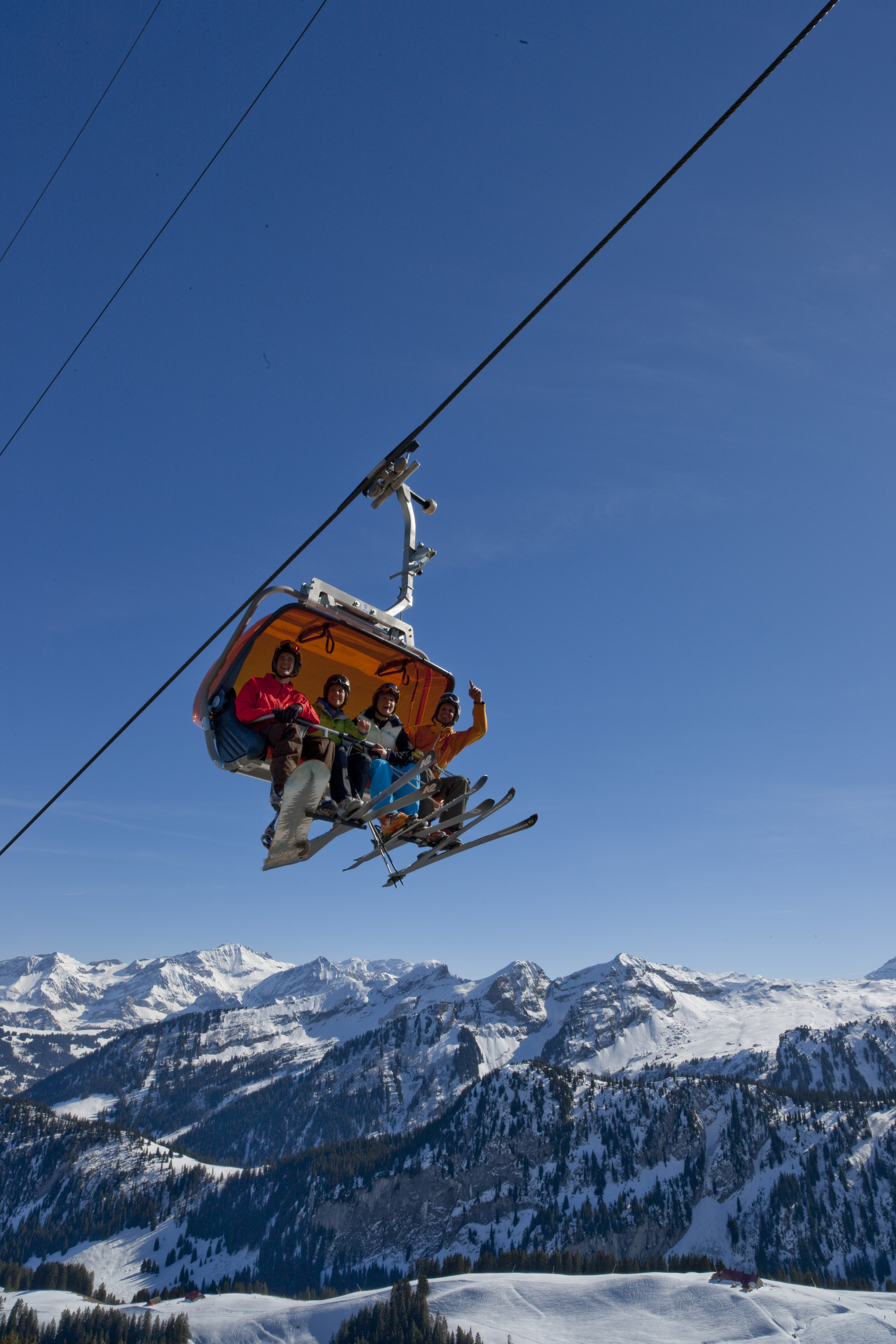
Mountain Railway Chalberhöni

Situated in the Berner Oberland, Gstaad is home to a large ski area in the Alps (220 km (137 mi) of slopes). The middle of the village features a picturesque promenade bounded by numerous shops, restaurants, art galleries, and hotels. This car-free promenade enhances the village’s tranquil atmosphere, allowing visitors to leisurely explore its traditional wooden chalets and upscale boutiques without vehicular interruptions. Designer labels including Louis Vuitton, Hermès, Chopard, Brunello Cucinelli (company), Prada, Moncler, Ralph Lauren, and Cartier all have stores in Gstaad, while many smaller boutiques stock labels such as Chloé, Dolce & Gabbana, Tod’s, Burberry, Dior, Oscar de la Renta, and Marc Jacobs.

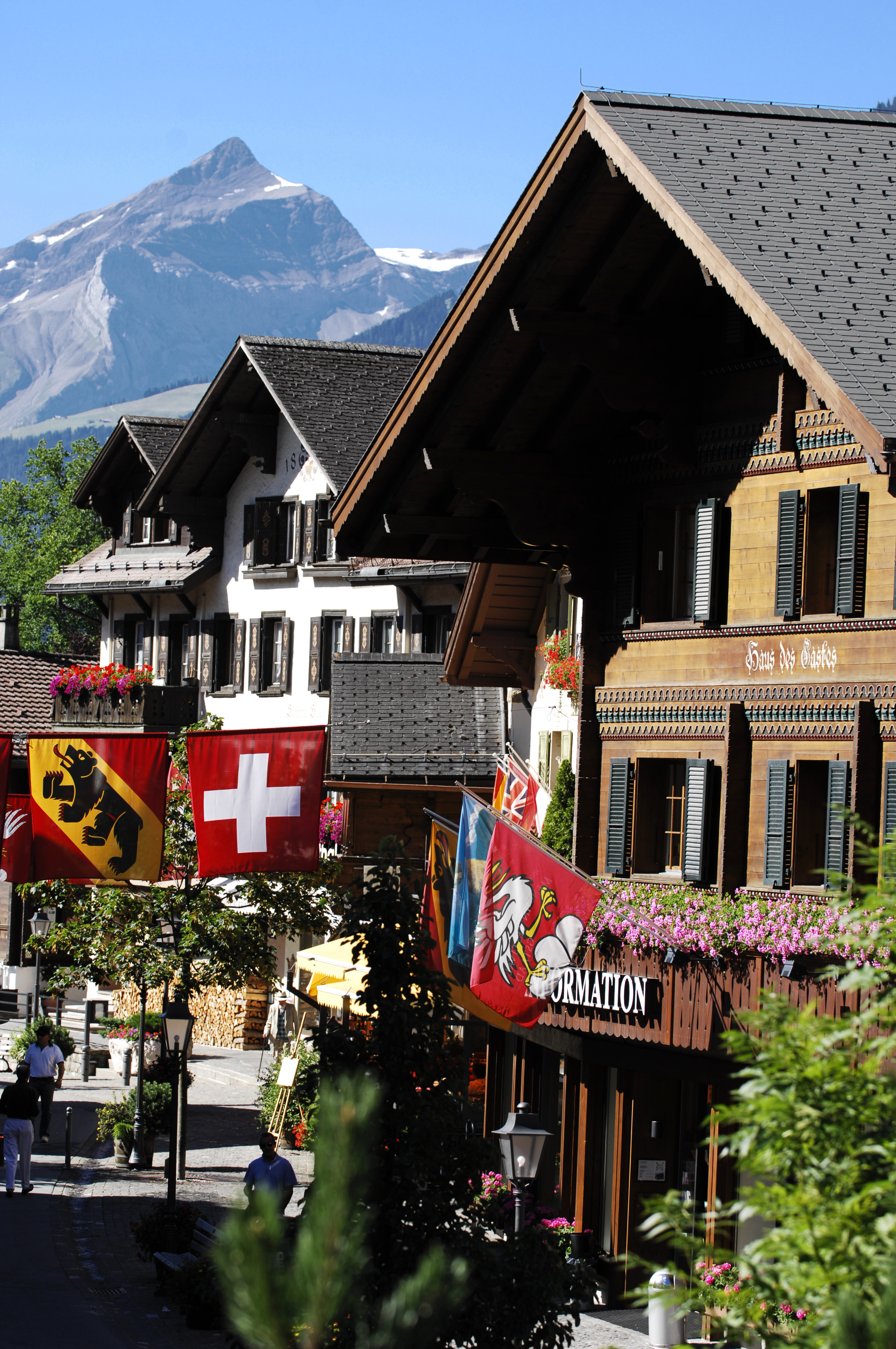
Promenade Gstaad

Gstaad is known for its ski and cross-country slopes and as well as it's walking and hiking trails. Glacier 3000 is a major attraction, offering guaranteed snow from December to March and high-altitude experiences, including the world’s first summit-to-summit suspension footbridge with views of the Matterhorn and Mont Blanc. Gstaad also offers distinctive culinary experiences, such as the ‘Fondueland Gstaad,’ where visitors can eat fondue in oversized outdoor caquelon pots set amidst scenic Alpine landscapes. To facilitate this, fondue backpacks contain all the necessary ingredients and equipment that can be rented from local dairies, allowing for a dining experience in nature.

Gstaad, named "The Place" by Time magazine in the 1960s, is widely known for its famous part-time residents and vacationers. Famous regular visitors to Gstaad have included Madonna, Charles III and Princess Diana, former UN Secretary-General Kofi Annan, haute couture designer Valentino Garavani, writer William F. Buckley, Jr., and various members of the Cavendish family. Many British bands and musicians would play at L'Atelier, a club in Gstaad, in the 1960s and 1970s; one such band was Merlin 'Q' (later Edison Lighthouse), who stayed a whole winter. The town has been coined “The Swiss Alps’ Best-Kept Secret,” by Los Angeles magazine.

=== Hotels ===
Gstaad is known for its luxury hotels, among them the Grand Hotel Park, the Alpina Gstaad, the Gstaad Palace, the Grand Hotel Bellevue, the Hotel Olden, and the Arc En Ciel. In July 2019, the Arc En Ciel came under fire for discrimination and later apologized after issuing a notice of rules directly addressed to its Indian guests.

=== Regular events ===
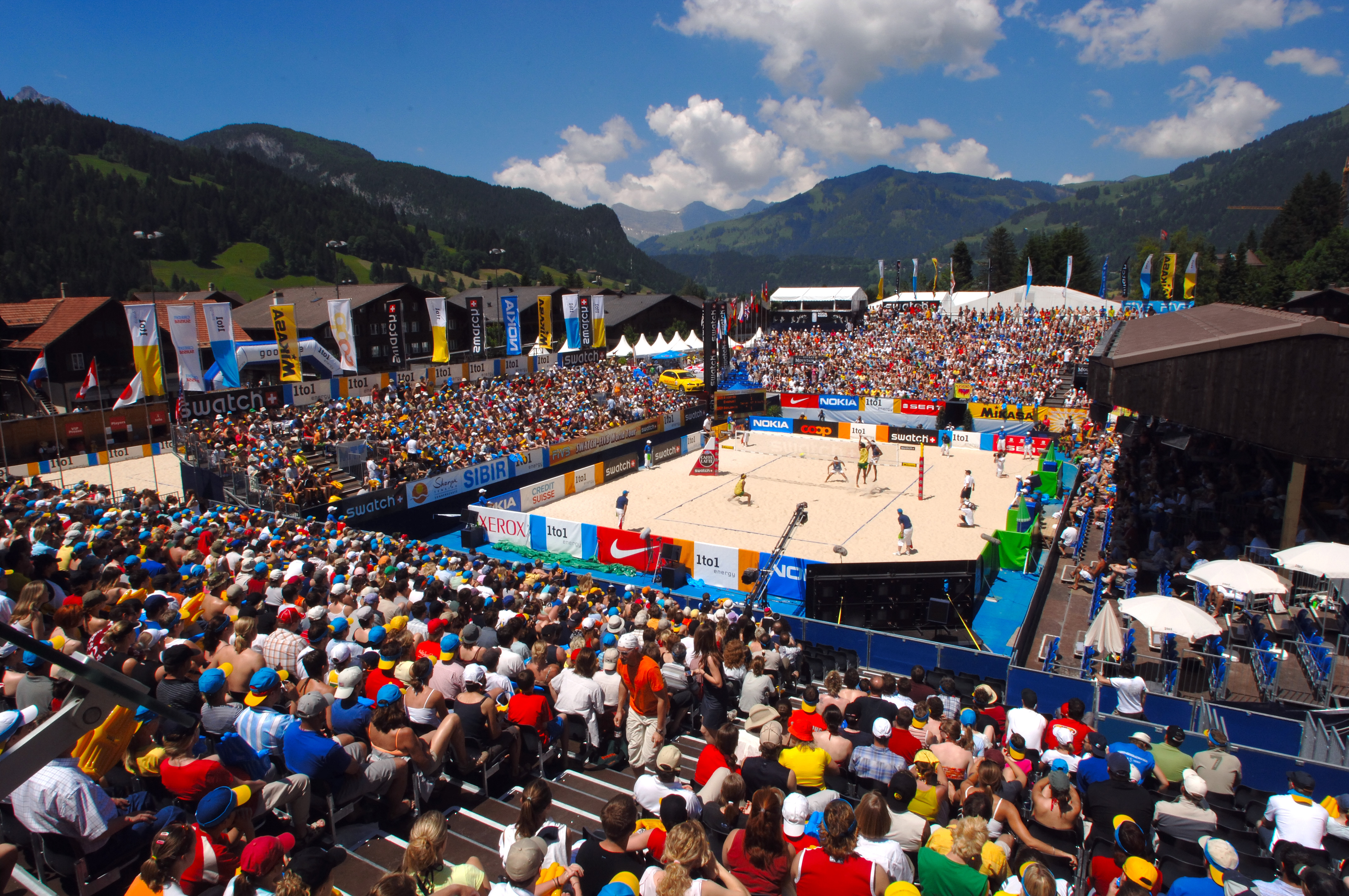
Beachvolleyball Tournament Gstaad—court: Roy Emerson Arena

In Gstaad, the following regular events are held:

- the New Year Music Festival of Gstaad, held by the Princess Caroline Murat
- the Sommets Musicaux de Gstaad classical music winter series
- the Snow Bike Festival, a winter snow biking event
- the FIVB Beach Volleyball SWATCH World Tour - 1to1 energy Grand Slam, beach volleyball tournament
- the Swiss Open, tennis tournament
- the Ladies Championship Gstaad, tennis tournament
- the Gstaad Menuhin Festival, classical music
- the Hublot Polo Gold Cup, polo tournament
- the Country Night Gstaad
- the Gstaad Promenade Party in September
- the Christmas Market Circus in December
- the International Week - Hot Air Ballooning in January
- the Gstaad Mountain Rides Open in January

== Education ==
Several boarding schools are located in or have a campus in Gstaad:

- Institut Le Rosey
- John F. Kennedy International School
- Gstaad International School, formerly in Gstaad, closed in June, 2014. It is scheduled to be redeveloped into an all-boys' school, Surval Gstaad.

== Sport ==
Gstaad was the start and finishing point of the 2025 Tour de Suisse Women Stage One.The winner was Swiss rider Marlen Reusser

In 2026 (26–27 September), Gstaad is scheduled to host the first edition of the Swiss Highlands Trail, a two-day trail running event in the Saanenland region.

== Notable residents ==
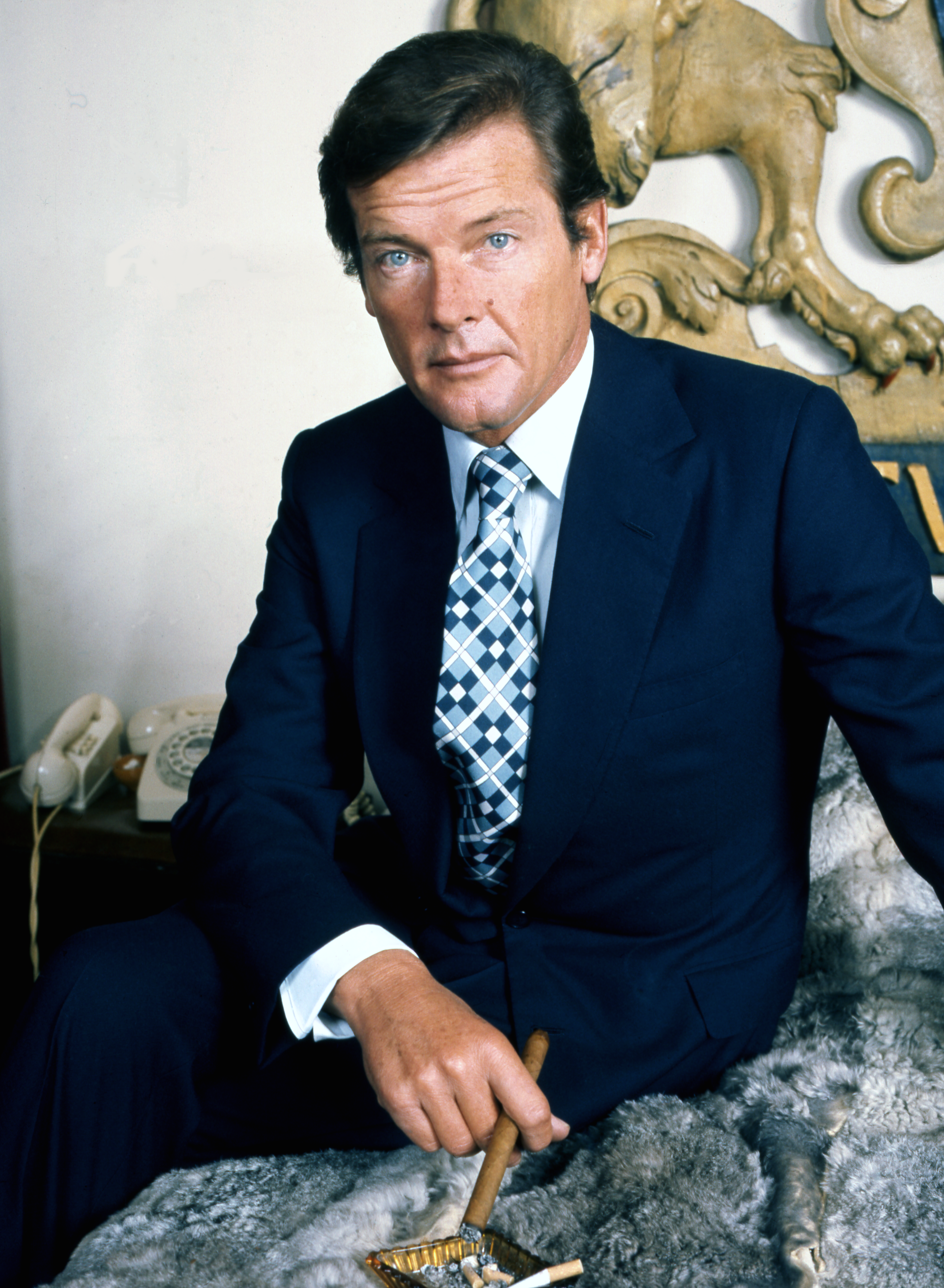
Roger Moore, 1973

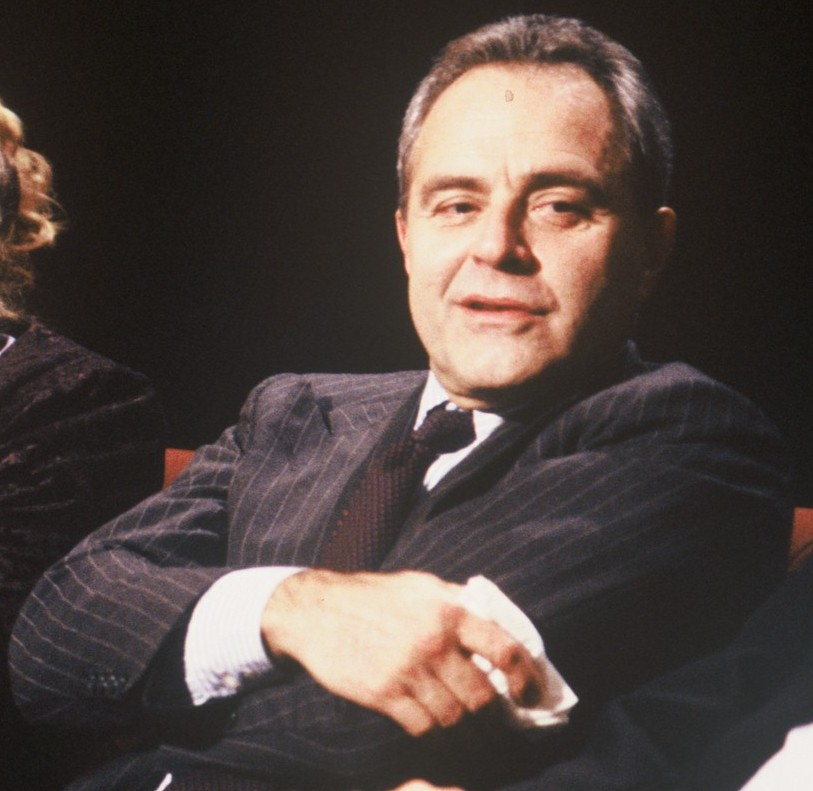
Taki Theodoracopolous, 1991

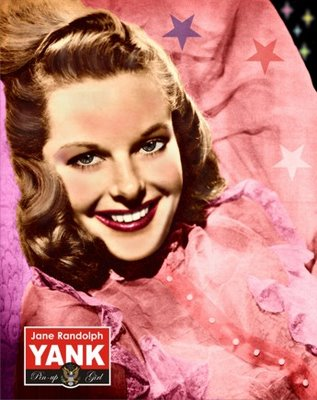
Jane Randolph, 1942

Current and former residents of Gstaad include:

Royalty

- Grace Kelly (1929–1982), American film actress and Princess of Monaco
- Mohammad Reza Pahlavi (1919–1980), the last Shah of Iran
- Prince Rainier (1923–2005), Prince of Monaco

The Arts

- Balthus (1908–2001), Polish-French modern artist (Grand Chalet, Rossinière)
- Olivier Berggruen (born 1963), German-American art historian and curator.
- William F. Buckley Jr. (1925–2008), American conservative commentator, author and columnist.
- Friedrich Christian Flick (born 1944), German-Swiss art collector
- Andrew Grima (1921–2007), Anglo-Italian designer and doyen of modern jewelry design in Britain
- Johnny Hallyday (1943–2017), French rock and roll and pop singer.
- Maja Hoffmann (born 1956), art collector & founder of the LUMA Foundation.
- Yehudi Menuhin (1916–1999), American-born violinist and conductor
- Richard Scarry (1919–1994), American children's author and illustrator
- Justin Thannhauser (1892–1976), German art dealer, disseminated Modern art in Europe
- Taki Theodoracopulos (born 1936), a Greek journalist, writer and columnist.
- Madonna (born 1958), American pop singer.
- Robbie Williams (born 1974) English singer and songwriter, former member of pop group Take That.

Acting

- Dame Julie Andrews (born 1935), English actress, singer and author.
- Blake Edwards (1922–2010), American film director, and actor.
- Sir Roger Moore (1927–2017), English actor.
- Jeanne Moreau (1928–2017), French actress, singer, screenwriter and director.
- Roman Polanski (born 1933), French-Polish film director, producer, writer and actor.
- Jane Randolph (1914–2009), American film actress.
- Peter Sellers (1925–1980), English film actor, comedian and singer.
- Dame Elizabeth Taylor (1932–2011), British-American actress.

Business

- Ernesto Bertarelli (born 1965), Italian-born Swiss billionaire businessman and philanthropist
- Philipp Braunwalder, Swiss businessman and philanthropist
- Bernie Ecclestone (born 1930), British Formula One business magnate.
- Curt Engelhorn (1926–2016), German billionaire, heir of the chemical company BASF
- Jean Claude Mimran (born 1945) businessman, the majority owner of the hotel Alpina Gstaad
- Mortimer and Jacqueline Sackler, American heirs of Purdue Pharma makers of the opioid OxyContin.
- George Soros (born 1930), Hungarian-American banker and activist

== Popular culture ==
- The song “Zarasa Jhoom Lu Main” from the evergreen Indian film Dilwale Dulhaniya Le Jayenge (1995) was shot in Gstaad.
- Gstaad is one of the locations featured in F. Scott Fitzgerald's novel Tender Is the Night (1934).
- "Swiss Miss", the second-season premiere of the American animated television series Archer, takes place in Gstaad.
- Season 4, episode 8 of the TV show Chuck has Chuck in Gstaad with a unique spy in order to try to recover the Intersect.
- Richard Scarry had a studio in Gstaad where he drew many of his books.
- Philosopher Jiddu Krishnamurti was an occasional visitor to Gstaad; he included the experiences of his 1961 visit in his diary Krishnamurti's Notebook.
- Some scenes of Blake Edwards's movie The Return of the Pink Panther with Peter Sellers were filmed in Gstaad.
- Many Bollywood movies in the mid 1990s and 2000s were shot in this town.
- Dan Aykroyd famously said to Bo Diddley in the movie, Trading Places, "This is a Rochefoucauld,” he says, “the thinnest water-resistant watch in the world. Singularly unique, sculptured in design, hand-crafted in Switzerland, and water resistant to three atmospheres. This is the sports watch of the 1980s. Six thousand, nine hundred and fifty-five dollars retail! It tells time simultaneously in Monte Carlo, Beverly Hills, London, Paris, Rome, and Gstaad!"
- In Season 5, Episode 9 of New Girl, Schmidt and Winston get into an argument about which one of them has actually been to Gstaad. Regan (played by Megan Fox) interjects and tells them to tell the truth about whether either of them has actually ever been to Gstaad. Feeling insecure, Winston presses Regan about whether she has been to Gstaad and she responds by saying "No I haven't been there. Should I be ashamed of that or can we all just tell the truth about whether we've been to "Shtaad."
- "Gstaad Guy", an internet personality, parodies the nouveau riche and old money residents of Gstaad.
- In Frasier episode "Murder Most Maris", Niles encounters a photo of himself and socialite divorced wife Maris in front of the fictional Experimental Liposuction Center in Gstaad. He sighs that was where they went on their honeymoon.
- In Fargo season 3, the antagonist V.M. Varga is quoted saying "You've no idea what rich means. Rich is a fleet of private planes filled with decoys to mask your scent. It's a banker in Wyoming and another in Gstaad."
- In The Santa Clause 3, Jack Frost lives in Gstaad.
- In Forgetting Sarah Marshall Brian Bretter (played by Bill Hader) suggests to Peter Bretter (played by Jason Segel) to "Go to Gstaad. It's the best."
- In the 1984 Dynasty episode "New Lady in Town," Dominique Deveraux (played by Diahann Carroll) states "You were actually expelled from a boarding school in Gstaad and you worked for several months as an artist's model in Hamburg of all places" to Alexis Carrington-Colby (played by Joan Collins) who replies, "Wrong, it was Brussels of all places and this is all absolute trivia."
- Gstaad is mentioned in Stephen King's It.
- The racehorse Gstaad, who won the Breeders Cup Juvenile Turf and Irish 2000 Guineas, is named after this place.

== See also ==
- List of ski areas and resorts in Switzerland
