= Jordan Schur =

American music executive

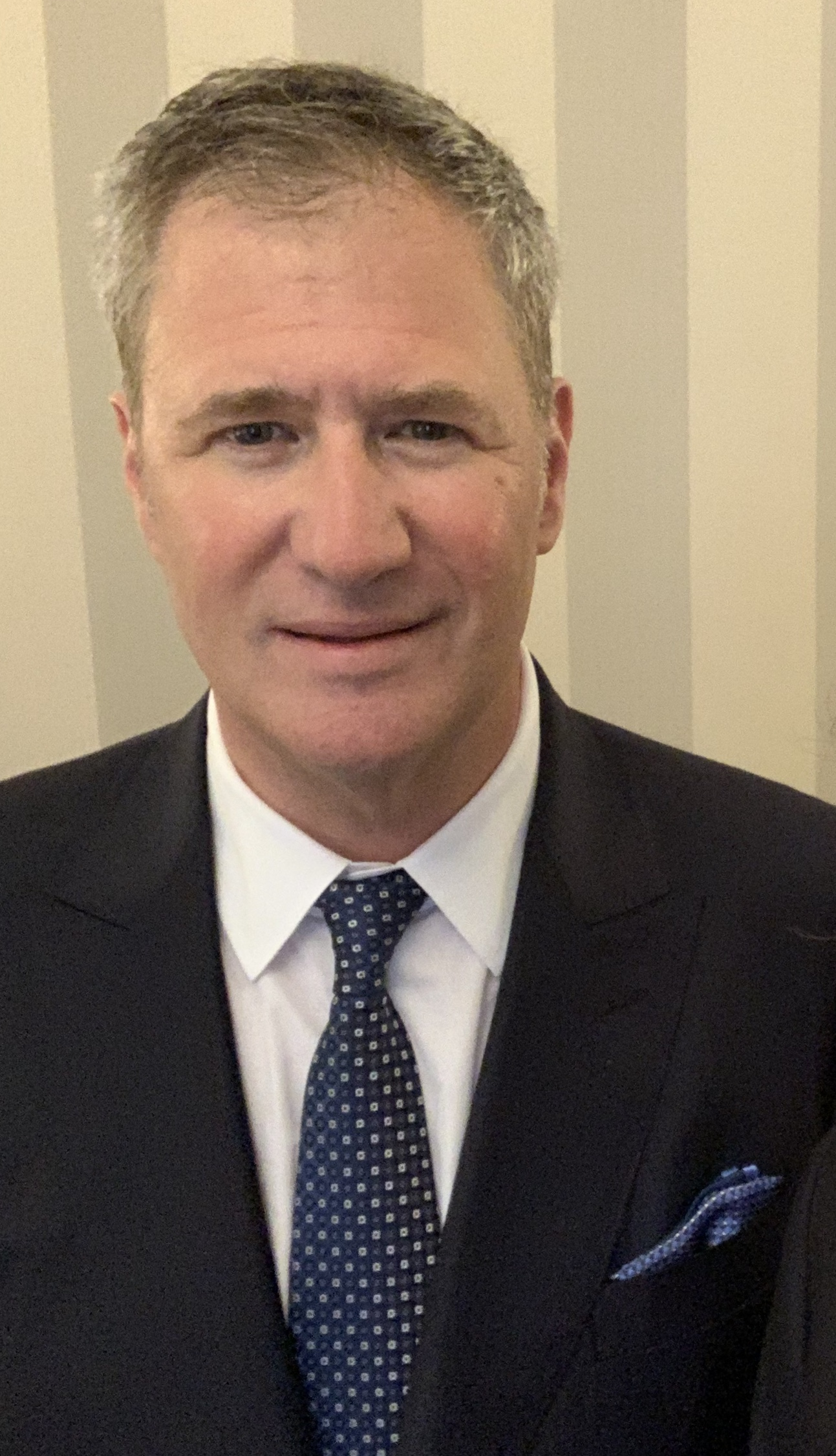
- Schur in 2019
- Born: c. 1965 (age 60–61)
- Occupations: Entrepreneur; record executive; film producer
- Years active: 1986–present
- Known for: Founder of Flip Records and Suretone Records; President of Geffen Records (1999–2006)
- Website: jschur.com

Jordan Schur (born 1965) is an American entrepreneur, record executive and film producer. He is currently co-chairman and CEO of the film production company Mimran Schur Pictures. He is also the former President of Geffen Records, the founder of Flip Records and Suretone Records as well as the Chairman and CEO of the music, television, and film production company Suretone Entertainment.

== Career ==
In 1999, the 35 year-old Schur took over as president of Geffen Records. In 2003, Schur also became president of MCA Records and oversaw the acquisition of DreamWorks Records, and merged them into the newly formed Geffen Records label.

In 2006, Schur left Geffen Records and established Suretone Records, a joint venture with Interscope Records. He also launched the MTV reality series Buzzin' that highlighted the rise of Suretone artist Shwayze.

In 2009, Schur and longtime friend David Mimran partnered to form the film production company Mimran Schur Pictures. Their first film was Stone, followed by Henry's Crime. Both films premiered at Toronto. In 2011, Mimran Schur Pictures partnered with Lionsgate to release the action drama Warrior. Other Mimran Schur Pictures projects include Pawn Shop Chronicles. In 2017 Mimran Schur Picture invested over $10 million in co-financing the box office movies Holmes and Watson and Bloodshot.

In 2019, he produced the film The Kid for Lionsgate Films.

== Television ==
Year	Title	Credit	Format
2008	The Cure: 4Play in Charlotte	Executive producer	TV movie
2008	Buzzin'	Executive producer	TV series
2005	Lifehouse: Live In Portland!	Executive producer	TV special
