= Julie Ordon =

Swiss model and actress (born 1984)

- Born: 27 June 1984 (age 41); Geneva, Switzerland
- Modeling information
- Height: 1.72 m (5 ft 7 1/2 in)
- Hair color: Brown
- Eye color: Blue/green
- Agency: Karin Models (Paris); Model Management (Hamburg)

Julie Ordon (born 27 June 1984) is a Swiss model and actress.

== Career ==
=== Modeling ===
Ordon, the youngest of four sisters, moved to Paris in 1999 after winning a talent contest and signing a contract with now-defunct Madison Models Agency. She has appeared in campaigns for Biotherm, Tally Weijl, Guess, and Bebe, and has appeared in Victoria's Secret catalogs. She starred in the Chanel Rouge Allure lipstick commercial, an hommage to Jean-Luc Godard's film Le Mépris, which featured the young Brigitte Bardot. Ordon has also appeared in television commercials for Carte Noir and Narta. She has appeared on the cover of the French edition of Elle several times, the French edition of Playboy in December 2007, Glamour, and Cosmo. In October 2009, she appeared pregnant in the 30th anniversary edition of Vogue Germany, as seen through the lens of photographer Bruce Weber. In 2010, she appeared in the Sports Illustrated Swimsuit Issue.

=== Film ===
Ordon made her film debut in 2002 in Cédric Anger's Novela. She then portrayed one of the main characters in the 2003 movie Inquiétudes by director Gilles Bourdos (released with the title "A Sight for Sore Eyes" in the US). A supporting role in the 2004 independent feature Point & Shoot directed by Shawn Regruto led to the steamy opener in bed with Daniel Craig in 2008's Flashbacks of a Fool. She was also filmed in Indian Bollywood romantic comedy drama picture Befikre as "Christine".

== Personal life ==
Ordon has three siblings, from which she is the youngest adult. Her sisters are named Valérie, Joëlle and Laïla. Ordon has kept her private life quiet. Ordon's first daughter was born in Geneva in 2009. The father is David Mimran, a Swiss-French businessman involved in finance, music and film, and the son of Jean Claude Mimran.
