= Ingrid Dee Magidson =

American painter

- Magidson in her studio 2013
- Education: Self-taught
- Known for: Assemblage
- Movement: Contemporary

Ingrid Dee Magidson is an American artist known for her use of combining industrial materials, collage, paint and Renaissance and Baroque images into transparent layers or shadow boxes. Influenced by Joseph Cornell, Salvador Dalí and the Surrealists in her use of antique objects, butterflies and insect specimens. She is largely self-taught, but is heavily involved in contemporary art and in contact with many well known contemporary artists.

== Career ==
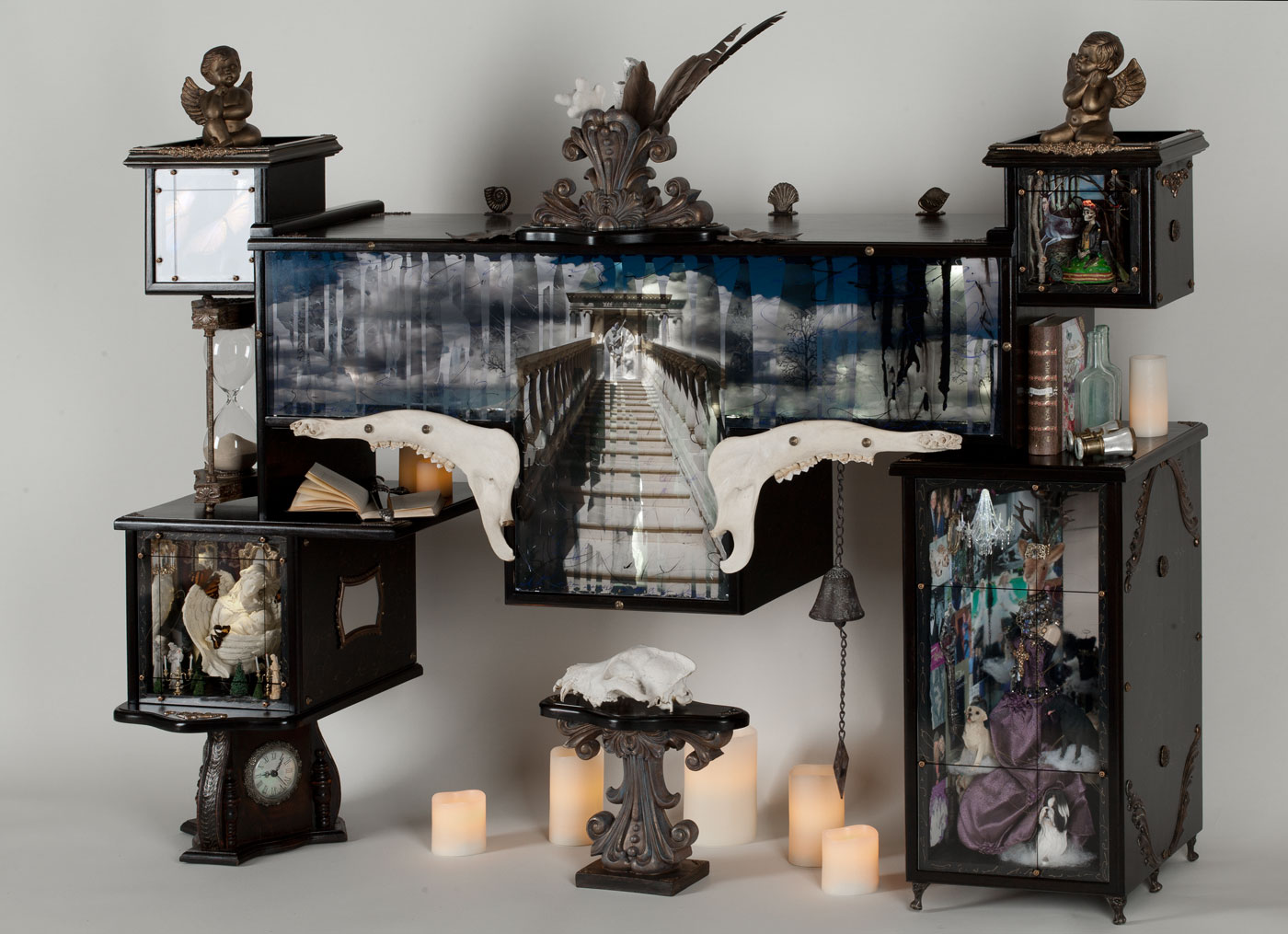
Cherished Echoes From Afar, layered mixed media assemblage commission for Carolyn Farb 2015

Her art career began in 2005 when she started experimenting with flexible transparent sheets of acetate on which Renaissance images had been transferred. Behind this semi-clear sheet she laid collage, paint and antique objects into a kind of sandwich. The acetate was not transparent enough to elicit the floating quality of the subject she was searching for and soon moved to rigid panels of clear acrylic or Plexiglas. By increasing the space between the collaged background, she was able to put more objects and place butterflies into work. Of particular interest to her work are the Morpho butterflies with their huge wings, intense cobalt blue and reflective surfaces; though she often includes other native and exotic species of butterflies and large insects in her work. By 2007 she had perfected her technique and amassed enough work to present her art for her first one-woman exhibition. In 2008, actors Melanie Griffith and Antonio Banderas acquired a large work for their NYC home. In 2011, the Hermitage Museum Foundation in New York City, a non-profit arm of the Hermitage Museum, featured a work of Magidson's dedicated to Catherine the Great at their annual dinner hosted by Sotheby's Auction House. They continued to feature Magidson's work honoring Catherine the Great at their annual dinners in 2012 at Phillips de Pury and 2013 at the Urban Zen Center. Dara Mitchell, Executive Vice President of American Paintings at Sotheby's saw her work at the close of the 2011 Hermitage Museum Foundation Gala and acquired multiple works. Magidson has had over 30 one-person exhibitions, and 20 group exhibitions to date (2017), including having her work exhibited in international art fairs, such as The Armory Show, New York City, Art Basel Singapore, Zona Maco in Mexico City and Art Toronto, Canada.

== Selected exhibitions ==
- ArtBase Annex Museum, Basalt, CO 2015
- Hermitage Museum Foundation, NYC, 2011, 2012, 2013
- ArtCrush, Aspen Art Museum annual gala, 2013
- Unix Gallery, NYC, 2013
- Ann Korologos Gallery, Basalt, CO, 2012
- Singleton-Biss Museum of Fine Art, Santa Fe, MN, 2010
- Bill Lowe Gallery, Atlanta, GA, 2009
- Marion Meyer Gallery, Laguna Beach, CA, 2008, 2009
- Anderson Ranch Art Center, 2008
- Magidson Fine Art Gallery, Aspen, CO, 2007

== Notable collections ==
- Alpina Gstaad
- Antonio Banderas
- Jackie Bezos (philanthropist, mother of Jeff Bezos)
- Gideon Gartner
- Dara Mitchell (former Executive V.P. of American Paintings, Sotheby's Auction House, NYC)
- Lloyd Schermer
- Sam Wyly
