= Stairs 1 Geneva =

- Directed by: Peter Greenaway
- Produced by: Jean-Daniel Bloesch
- Starring: Patrick di Santo
- Narrated by: Peter Greenaway
- Cinematography: Patrick Mounoud
- Edited by: France de Wustemberger
- Music by: Patrick Mimran
- Release date: 1994
- Running time: 107 min
- Country: Switzerland

Stairs 1 Geneva is a 1994 Swiss art film directed by Peter Greenaway. It is also a large-scale art installation, an exhibition, a catalogue and a CD album.

== The film ==
The film comprises one hundred sequences showing a location in the city of Geneva, Switzerland. In 1994, over a period of one hundred days, one hundred white wooden staircases were installed around the city to be climbed by the public. At the top of each staircase was a simple hole framing a "living picture postcard", a perfect "cinema-image by Peter Greenaway" accompanied by a commentary of one sentence in French and English, printed below the viewfinder. Greenaway's idea was to create a reflection on location in cinema and to "take films out of the theatres".

== The event ==
Spotlights of different colors were installed throughout the city. The event was called "The Stairs: Geneva The Location", and was expanded into a wider project including other cities and other cinematic themes of relaxation. The events were also published in a catalogue form and a musical compact disc (Merrell, March 1995).

== The installation ==
Approximately one hundred performers representing typical regional characters, with costumes and props, (Calvin and his fellows reformers, different spirits of the lake, Laura Ashley with her bicycle, living statues, etc.), were sited within the framed view of the staircases' viewfinders. They all were specially trained to perform a choreography (by Serge Campardon ) every 15 minutes. Each performer was given a luxury Genevan watch to check the time throughout the five or more hours of their performance.

== Further details ==
The film's scenes show day or night views in the exact frame defined by the staircase's viewfinder. Superimposed images make some of the characters of the installation appear and disappear in the frame under different lights, and are linked with different kind of local events, such as a cycle race or a children's choir on the cathedral steps. The voice-over patiently helps the visual description by numbering the scenes by the same number of each staircase, and reading the sentence printed on the viewfinder. Each scene is accompanied by a one-minute music pattern by Patrick Mimran,. The soundtrack CD which accompanies the project suggests each piece can be played randomly, just as a visitor could visit the staircases in any order.

An exhibition was also set in the Musée d'Art et d'Histoire where lights and slide projections supplemented a display of one hundred sculpted heads found and chosen in the museum depot, as well as one hundred historical helmets.
