= Warrior (2011 film) =

2011 film by Gavin O'Connor

- Theatrical release poster
- Directed by: Gavin O'Connor
- Screenplay by: Gavin O'Connor; Anthony Tambakis; Cliff Dorfman
- Story by: Gavin O'Connor; Cliff Dorfman
- Produced by: Gavin O'Connor; Greg O'Connor; David Mimran; Jordan Schur
- Starring: Joel Edgerton; Tom Hardy; Jennifer Morrison; Frank Grillo; Nick Nolte
- Cinematography: Masanobu Takayanagi
- Edited by: John Gilroy; Sean Albertson; Matt Chesse; Aaron Marshall
- Music by: Mark Isham
- Production companies: Mimran Schur Pictures; Solaris Entertainment; Filmtribe
- Distributed by: Lionsgate
- Release date: September 9, 2011
- Running time: 140 minutes
- Country: United States
- Language: English
- Budget: $25 million
- Box office: $23.3 million

Warrior is a 2011 American martial arts sports drama film directed by Gavin O'Connor. It stars Tom Hardy and Joel Edgerton as two estranged brothers whose entrance into a mixed martial arts tournament makes them come to terms with their lives and each other. Nick Nolte, Jennifer Morrison, Frank Grillo, and Bryan Callen appear in supporting roles. Real-life MMA and combat sports figures like Kurt Angle, Nate Marquardt, Anthony Johnson, Roan Carneiro, Yves Edwards, Amir Perets, and Dan Caldwell make appearances.

The film was theatrically released in the United States on September 9, 2011, by Lionsgate. Although not commercially successful, the film received positive reviews from critics, with Nolte receiving an Academy Award nomination for Best Supporting Actor.

== Plot ==
A melancholic U.S. Marine Thomas "Tommy" Riordan visits his estranged father, Paddy Conlon, a recovering alcoholic who has returned to his Roman Catholic faith in Pittsburgh, Pennsylvania. As a child, Tommy and his mom ran away from Pittsburgh because of Paddy's abusive alcoholism. Paddy tries to convince Tommy that he has changed, but to no avail. The next day, Tommy joins a fighting gym where he offers to spar Pete "Mad Dog" Grimes, one of the world's best middleweight fighters. After he quickly knocks out the more accomplished fighter, a video of Tommy's sparring match goes viral. After his success, the owner of the gym allows Tommy to enter a mixed martial arts tournament called Sparta, which has a prize pool of $5 million. Tommy returns to Paddy's to train and live with him, though he makes it clear this is not a reconciliation. Meanwhile, in the Iraq, a group of Marines watches Tommy's fight while one of them recognizes him.

Simultaneously, Tommy's older brother Brendan, a high school physics teacher and former Ultimate Fighting Championship fighter, is struggling to provide for his wife, Tess, and their two daughters. After mortgaging their home in Philadelphia to pay for his younger daughter's open heart surgery, the bank is threatening to foreclose the house. Unbeknownst to Tess, Brendan begins battling amateur fighters to earn extra income. He is suspended without pay after details of his secret fights spread around the school he works for. Paddy finds Brendan in Philadelphia to try and reconcile, but is unsuccessful. The interaction ends with Paddy telling his son that Tommy is back in town and living with him. The next day, Brendan seeks out his old friend and trainer Frank Campana to begin competing in larger venue fights; however, Frank chooses not to enter him into Sparta. After several weeks of intense training, the fighter that was going to enter into Sparta is injured, and Brendan convinces Frank to enter him as a replacement.

When the brothers arrive in Atlantic City, New Jersey for Sparta, Brendan spots Tommy at the opening press conference. Tommy leaves after Brendan tries to approach him. Despite avoiding the public, the marine who recognized Tommy from his fight with Mad Dog informs the media that Tommy ripped off the door of a sinking tank to save his life in Iraq. The revelation causes the media to paint Tommy as a war hero, though he shuns the attention. Brendan reaches out to Paddy for Tommy's location, stirring up a late night confrontation on the beach. Tommy remains angry with Brendan for choosing to stay with Tess when Tommy and their mother left Paddy years before; Tommy was left alone across the country in Seattle, Washington to care for their mother when she became terminally ill. Brendan justifies his decision and asks for forgiveness, but Tommy refuses.

In their first two fights, Brendan and Tommy win in contrasting ways: Tommy quickly and brutally knocks out opponents, while Brendan is outmatched physically but uses Brazilian Jiu-Jitsu to force grappling submissions. On opposite sides of the bracket, it is unlikely the two brothers will meet each other.

The night before the second and final day, Paddy attempts to talk to Tommy about his actions in Iraq. Tommy angrily dismisses his father, revealing that he deserted his unit in Iraq. Releasing his pent-up emotions. Tommy viciously rejects his father by saying "the only thing I have in common with Brendan Conlon is that we have absolutely no use for you." That night, Paddy relapses. Waking up to see his father drunk, Tommy calms and comforts him, holding him on the bed as Paddy says I love you.

Military police arrive to arrest Tommy, but allow him to finish the match after it is revealed that Tommy is planning to give the 5 million in prize money to Pilar, the widow of former marine Manny, who Tommy considered his only brother. In the semifinals, Tommy is matched up with Mad Dog Grimes, a rematch of his viral video, and beats him in seconds after a takedown and flurry of vicious punches. Brendan is matched up with undefeated Russian wrestler Koba, who dominates through two rounds. In the closing moments of the final round, Brendan wins by submission.

Tommy and Brendan's relationship as brothers is finally revealed to the world when they become the tournament's last fighters. Brendan tries again to reconcile, but Tommy shows no interest in doing so. Tommy wins the first two rounds, but Brendan eventually dislocates Tommy's shoulder with an omoplata arm-lock. As the fourth round starts, Tommy continues to fight. At the start of Round 5, Brendan realizes he has to force Tommy to submit, and he traps him in a rear-naked choke. As they struggle on the canvas, Brendan apologizes and saying "I love you" repeatedly. With a grateful and knowing smile, Paddy watches as his two sons exit the arena embracing each other.

== Cast ==
- Tom Hardy as Thomas "Tommy" Riordan Conlon, Brendan's brother
- Joel Edgerton as Brendan Conlon, Tommy's brother
- Nick Nolte as Paddy Conlon, Brendan and Tommy's father
- Jennifer Morrison as Tess Conlon, Brendan's wife and Tommy's sister-in-law
- Frank Grillo as Frank Campana
- Denzel Whitaker as Stephon
- Bryan Callen as himself
- Kevin Dunn as Principal Joe Zito
- Maximiliano Hernandez as Colt Boyd
- Sam Sheridan as himself
- Fernando Funan Chien as Ian Fenroy
- Jake McLaughlin as Mark Bradford
- Vanessa Martinez as Pilar Fernandez
- Noah Emmerich as Dan Taylor
- Laura Chinn as K.C.
- Capri Thomas as Emily Conlon, Brendan & Tess's first daughter and Tommy's first niece
- Lexi Cowan as Rosie Conlon, Brendan & Tess's second daughter and Tommy's second niece
- Carlos Miranda as Tito
- Nick Lehane as Nash
- Charlie Smith as Leo
- Kurt Angle as Koba
- Erik Apple as Pete "Mad Dog" Grimes
- Nate Marquardt as Karl "The Dane" Kruller
- Anthony Johnson as Orlando "Midnight" Le
- Roan Carneiro as Marcos Santos
- Yves Edwards as Houston Greggs
- Gavin O'Connor as J.J. Riley
- Amir Perets as Yosi Haas
- Dan Caldwell as himself
- Rashad Evans as himself

== Themes ==
Described by critics as "heartbreaking and emotionally satisfying", "really gripping", "an unapologetic powerhouse of emotional conflict" and self-described as a "rousing ode to redemption, reconciliation and the power of the human spirit", Warrior has received the most praise for the emotional approach it takes to the themes of forgiveness and "the enduring bonds of family" that it explores. In their review, Common Sense Media cites unconditional love as a major theme, further explaining that "some weighty issues" such as estrangement and alcoholism are also dealt with.

== Production ==
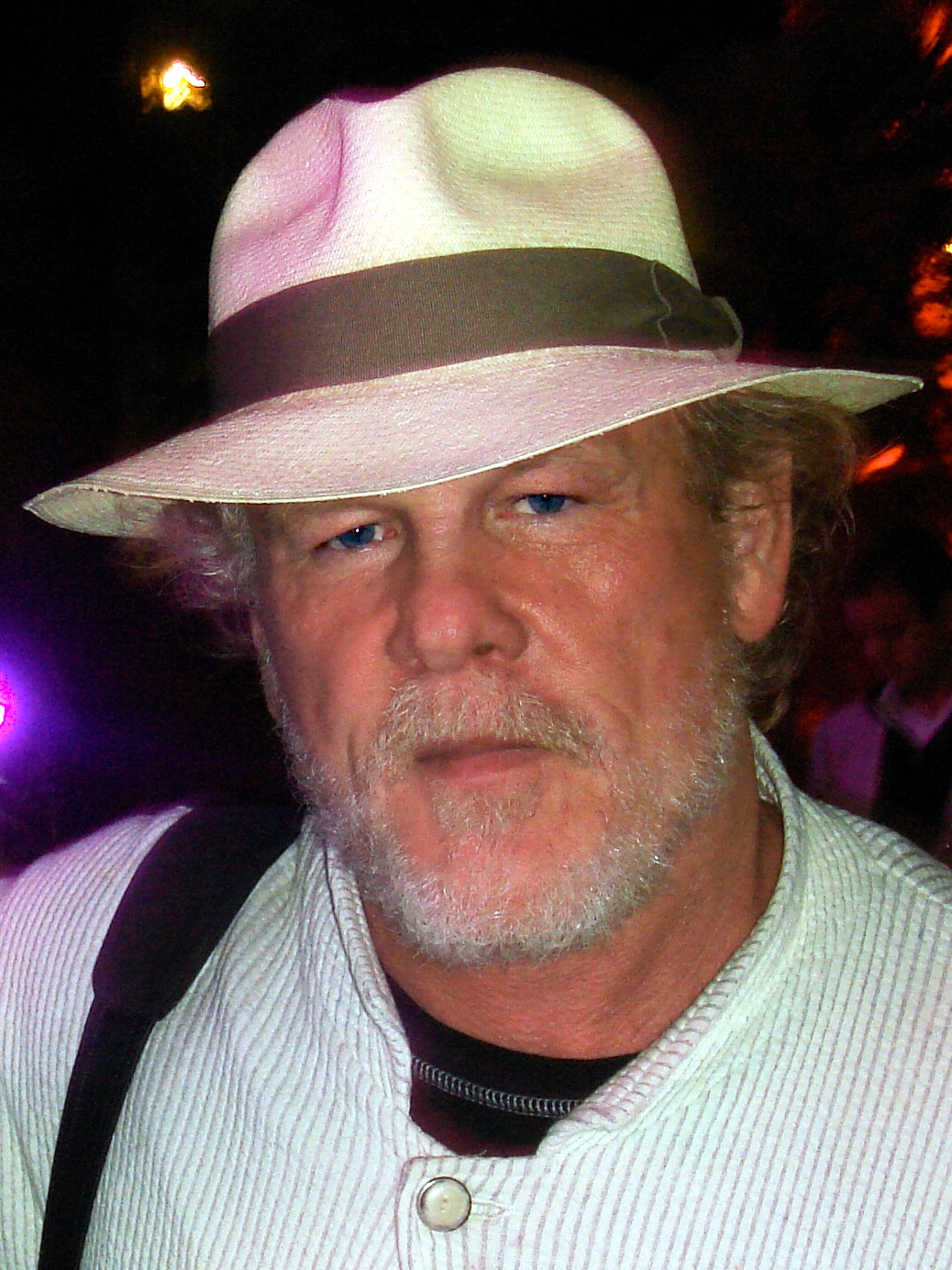
Actor Nick Nolte won San Diego Film Critics Society Award for Best Supporting Actor for his role as a recovering alcoholic father.

Mogul Minds Studios, (now 31st Street Studios), located in Pittsburgh, was used during the filming, as well as the University of Pittsburgh's Petersen Events Center and the Twin Hi-Way Drive-In. North Hills Senior High School was also used for some scenes. Boardwalk Hall in Atlantic City was used for the exterior scenes of the main fight venue, along with scenes filmed on the boardwalk and beach.

Hardy went through a demanding training routine for gaining muscle during the film's pre-production, gaining around 28 pounds (13 kg) of muscle (a physique which he also used to portray Bane in The Dark Knight Rises).

== Release ==
The film was released in the United States on September 9, 2011.

=== Marketing ===
The Men of Warrior book was released on July 19, 2011. Lionsgate's "We Are All Warriors" project to support the release of Warrior by highlighting everyday heroes was launched August 1, 2011.

== Home media ==
Warrior was released on DVD and Blu-ray in the United States on December 20, 2011. The Blu-ray release includes a DVD copy of the movie, as well as a downloadable digital copy. With the exception of the Blu-ray including an additional Feature Length Enhanced Viewing Mode, extras are similar between both releases.

== Reception ==
=== Box office ===
Warrior debuted in third place in its first week at the U.S. box office with $5.2 million behind Contagion and The Help. It dropped down to #8 the following weekend. Overall, the film made $13.7 million in the United States and Canada, and $9.6 million in foreign countries for a worldwide total of $23.3 million.

=== Critical response ===
On the review aggregator website Rotten Tomatoes, 84% of 191 critics' reviews are positive. The website's consensus reads: "Warrior relies on many of the clichés that critics of the genre love to mock — and it transcends them with gripping action, powerful acting, and heart." Metacritic, which uses a weighted average, assigned the film a score of 71 out of 100, based on 35 critics, indicating "generally favorable" reviews. Audiences polled by CinemaScore gave the film an average grade of "A" on an A+ to F scale.

Bruce Diones of The New Yorker highly praised the actors' performances, especially Tom Hardy's, as "convincingly real" and "sensational". He further complimented the film as "cathartic" and "winning," and said that the film as a whole "achieves a surprising compassion and honesty". Simon Miraudo from Quickflix praised the character development of brothers Tommy Riordan and Brendan Conlon: "When they speak to each other for the first time in the film – amazingly, only once before they actually meet in the ring – we understand their relationship completely." He called the film as a whole "beautiful" in spite of how violent it is, and gave it 4 out of 5 stars. Common Sense Media's Sandie Angulo Chen called the film "a touching family drama wrapped in an intense 'David vs. Goliath'-style fight". Meanwhile, Roger Ebert gave the film 3 out of 4 stars, declaring that "this is a rare fight movie in which we don't want to see either fighter lose", while praising Gavin O'Connor's direction and Nick Nolte's performance. Peter Travers of Rolling Stone was also complimentary towards O'Connor, stating that he "comes out swinging in this flawed but fiercely moving family drama", while A.O. Scott of The New York Times credited the film for being "appropriately blunt, powerful and relentless", also praising the "skillfully staged" fight scenes.

Andrew Pulver of The Guardian rated the film 2 out of 5 stars stating, "This mixed-martial-arts fight movie has received bafflingly high praise considering its lunkhead plot and rudimentary characters".

Kirk Honeycutt of The Hollywood Reporter stated, "For an 'entertainment', Warrior accomplishes a lot. The family drama resonates strongly with a resolution that, in retrospect, seems like the only way the brothers could have rediscovered blood ties."

Some critics, including Philip French from the UK newspaper The Observer, have noted similarities to other sports drama films such as Rocky (1976), The Wrestler (2008), and The Fighter (2010).

== Accolades ==
Award	Date of ceremony	Category	Recipient(s)	Result	Ref.
IGN Summer Movie Awards	September 20, 2011	Best Drama Movie	Warrior	Nominated	
San Diego Film Critics Society	December 12, 2011	Best Supporting Actor	Nick Nolte	Won	
Satellite Awards	December 18, 2011	Best Actor in a Motion Picture	Tom Hardy	Nominated	
Satellite Awards	December 18, 2011	Best Supporting Actor in a Motion Picture	Nick Nolte	Nominated	
Satellite Awards	December 18, 2011	Best Editing	Sean Albertson, Matt Chessé, John Gilroy, Aaron Marshall	Nominated	
Chicago Film Critics Association	December 19, 2011	Best Supporting Actor	Nick Nolte	Nominated	
Las Vegas Film Critics Society	December 19, 2011	Top 10 List	Warrior	10th place	
Dublin Film Critics' Circle	December 23, 2011	Top 10 Actors	Nick Nolte	5th place	
Online Film Critics Society	January 2, 2012	Best Supporting Actor	Nick Nolte	Nominated	
Denver Film Critics Society	January 9, 2012	Best Supporting Actor	Nick Nolte	Nominated	
Critics' Choice Movie Awards	January 12, 2012	Best Supporting Actor	Nick Nolte	Nominated	
Screen Actors Guild Awards	January 29, 2012	Outstanding Performance by a Male Actor in a Supporting Role	Nick Nolte	Nominated	
Academy Awards	February 26, 2012	Best Supporting Actor	Nick Nolte	Nominated	
MTV Movie & TV Awards	June 3, 2012	Best Fight	Joel Edgerton vs. Tom Hardy	Nominated	
Teen Choice Awards	July 22, 2012	Choice Movie Actor: Action	Tom Hardy	Nominated	
Prism Awards	November 7, 2012	Feature Film – Substance Use	Warrior	Won	
Prism Awards	November 7, 2012	Performance in a Feature Film	Nick Nolte	Nominated	

== Soundtrack ==
Warrior: Original Score is the soundtrack album for the film, composed and produced by Mark Isham. It was released by Lakeshore Records on September 13, 2011. An alternative extended version of "About Today" by the indie rock band The National was also featured on the soundtrack and also in the film during the final fight scene. The composition entitled "Listen to the Beethoven" incorporates elements of the final movement of Ludwig van Beethoven's ninth symphony, which is featured prominently throughout the film.

== Adaptations ==
The film had an Indian adaptation titled Brothers (2015) starring Akshay Kumar and Sidharth Malhotra in lead roles.

A film with the same title and similar plot was made in 2015 in Russia.
