= Stone (2010 film) =

- Theatrical release poster
- Directed by: John Curran
- Written by: Angus MacLachlan
- Produced by: Holly Wiersma; Jordan Schur; David Mimran
- Starring: Robert De Niro; Edward Norton; Milla Jovovich; Frances Conroy; Enver Gjokaj; Pepper Binkley
- Cinematography: Maryse Alberti
- Edited by: Alexandre de Franceschi
- Production company: Mimran Schur Pictures
- Distributed by: Overture Films; Relativity Media
- Release dates: September 10, 2010 (TIFF); October 8, 2010 (United States)
- Running time: 105 minutes
- Country: United States
- Language: English
- Budget: $22 million
- Box office: $10.3 million

Stone is a 2010 American crime thriller film directed by John Curran, written by Angus MacLachlan, and starring Robert De Niro, Edward Norton and Milla Jovovich. Most of the filming was done in Washtenaw County, Michigan. It is the final film to be released by Overture Films. It is the second film in which De Niro and Norton star together, after The Score (2001).

== Plot ==
Young mother Madylyn Mabry puts her daughter to bed while her husband Jack watches golf on television. After the child is asleep, Madylyn goes downstairs and announces that she is leaving Jack. Jack runs upstairs to the bedroom and holds their daughter out the window, threatening to drop her if Madylyn leaves, and Madylyn acquiesces.

Decades later, Jack and Madylyn return home from church for a quiet afternoon. He watches TV and drinks in his usual potion. Late that night, a call wakes them. Jack picks up the phone and hears a woman's voice. Jack reports to work at a prison, where he is a parole officer. He is called into the warden's office, and his upcoming retirement becomes a topic. Jack requests that he be allowed to keep all of his inmates until he leaves to see them through until review.

Jack has a new case: Inmate Gerald Creeson, who visits Jack's office. The inmate insists that he likes to be called Stone. Stone asks Jack if he can help him to be released early. Stone begins to ask questions about Jack's relationship with his wife. Jack explains that he does not want to discuss his wife and that they are there to talk about his case. Stone later phones his wife Lucetta from prison.

Stone and Jack hold several more meetings. Stone insists that he deserves to be free. He also begins reading literature about spiritual awakenings. One night, Lucetta leaves a message on Jack and Madylyn's answering machine. She shows up at the prison the next day to meet Jack, who rebuffs her. Lucetta phones Jack again, and they meet for lunch. They end up at Lucetta's home. After a few drinks, he sleeps with Lucetta. At prison, two guards arrive to escort Stone to the infirmary. While waiting for someone to see him, he witnesses another inmate brutally murdered.

Jack goes to see Lucetta several more times for sex, but Jack tells her that no one can know about their relationship. One day, he tells Stone that he sent the report recommending early release. Stone follows this by admitting to having no remorse for the arson that got him convicted. The next morning, Jack asks the warden for Stone's report. The warden informs him that Stone's parole hearing is in an hour and that no changes can be made. Jack does not stay for the hearing.

Stone is informed that he will be released. Stone tells Jack that he knows about the relationship between him and Lucetta. That night, saddled with paranoia, Jack goes home and is awakened by a fire in his home. Jack suspects Stone, but Madylyn believes that the fire is a punishment from God.

Madylyn and Jack's daughter Candace and their granddaughter look through photo albums. Candace tells her mother that she is surprised that she did not leave her father sooner.

Jack finds and confronts Stone with a revolver but cannot bring himself to shoot him, letting him leave. Jack is now retired, trying to determine his future.

== Cast ==
- Robert De Niro as Jack Mabry, a parole officer who is only weeks from retirement.
- Edward Norton as Gerald "Stone" Creeson, a convicted arsonist seeking parole by any means.
- Milla Jovovich as Lucetta, Stone's wife.
- Frances Conroy as Madylyn, Jack's wife.

Enver Gjokaj and Pepper Binkley appear as younger versions of Jack and Madylyn Mabry, respectively. Many Ypsilanti residents appear as extras.

== Production ==
The film was directed by John Curran, from a screenplay by Angus MacLachlan. Originally written by MacLachlan in 2000 as a play, it has been performed once, in 2003 as a staged reading. In 2005, MacLachlan turned it into a screenplay. The film was overseen by Mimran Schur Pictures, with the aid of producer Holly Wiersma.

Stone is the debut of Mimran Schur Pictures, formed in 2010 by private investor David Mimran and long-time music business executive and former Geffen Records president Jordan Schur. Stone Productions, the film's production company, also aided in the production of the film.

Filming began on May 18, 2009, in Michigan. Prison scenes were filmed at the Southern Michigan Correctional Facility in Blackman Township. The Emmanuel Lutheran Church of Ypsilanti hosted filming for two days. The funeral service and a few outside scenes were filmed at the church, with locals as extras. Mast Road in Dexter was closed for several weeks while the farmhouse scenes were shot at the historic Mast Farmhouse. At the end of the shoot, it was burned down.

Filming was interrupted on June 5, 2009, when an intoxicated fan got past security and accosted Robert De Niro. She was arrested and admitted to a local hospital.

Following a screening at the Toronto International Film Festival, Stone premiered in the United States at the Fantastic Fest in Austin, Texas, on September 24, 2010.

The main theme for the film was composed by musician Jon Brion.

== Reception ==
Stone received generally mixed reviews. Review aggregate Rotten Tomatoes reports that 49% of critics have given the film a positive review based on 104 reviews, with an average score of 5.7/10. The website's critics consensus reads, "Stone boasts a cast that includes Robert De Niro, Edward Norton, and Milla Jovovich, and it features strong dialogue, but it's ultimately undone by its heavy-handed symbolism and overabundant plot twists." Metacritic gave the film an average score of 58/100 based 27 reviews.

Roger Ebert of the Chicago Sun-Times, in a positive review of the film, wrote: "Stone has Robert De Niro and Edward Norton playing against type and at the top of their forms in a psychological duel between a parole officer and a tricky prisoner who has his number."

The film was a box-office bomb; as of November 11, 2010, the film had grossed US$8,463,124, which is approximately one-third of its production budget.

== Awards ==
Milla Jovovich received the Hollywood Spotlight Award for her work in Stone at the 14th Annual Hollywood Awards Gala at The Beverly Hilton in Beverly Hills.
