= Jacob Castello =

Dutch poet

Jacob Antonio Castello (or Jacob Antonio Castelo) was a Jewish poet of Sepharadi origins who lived in Amsterdam in the seventeenth century. He died sometime after 1684. He was a member of several academies of poetry in his native city, and he was well known for his innovative poetic riddles. Verses authored by Castello were included in the works Coro de las Musas by Miguel de Barrios and Rumbos Peligrosos by Joseph Penso.
