= Gervasoni =

Gervasoni is an Italian surname from the Lombardia region of Italy and the Ticino canton of Switzerland.

People with this surname include:

- Carlo Gervasoni (b. 1982), Italian football defender.
- Jack Gervasoni (1929–1992), Australian footballer and mayor
- Lisa Gervasoni (b. 1969), Australian artist and planner
- Stefano Gervasoni (b. 1962), Italian composer
