= Patrick Mimran =

French multimedia artist and composer (born 1956 )

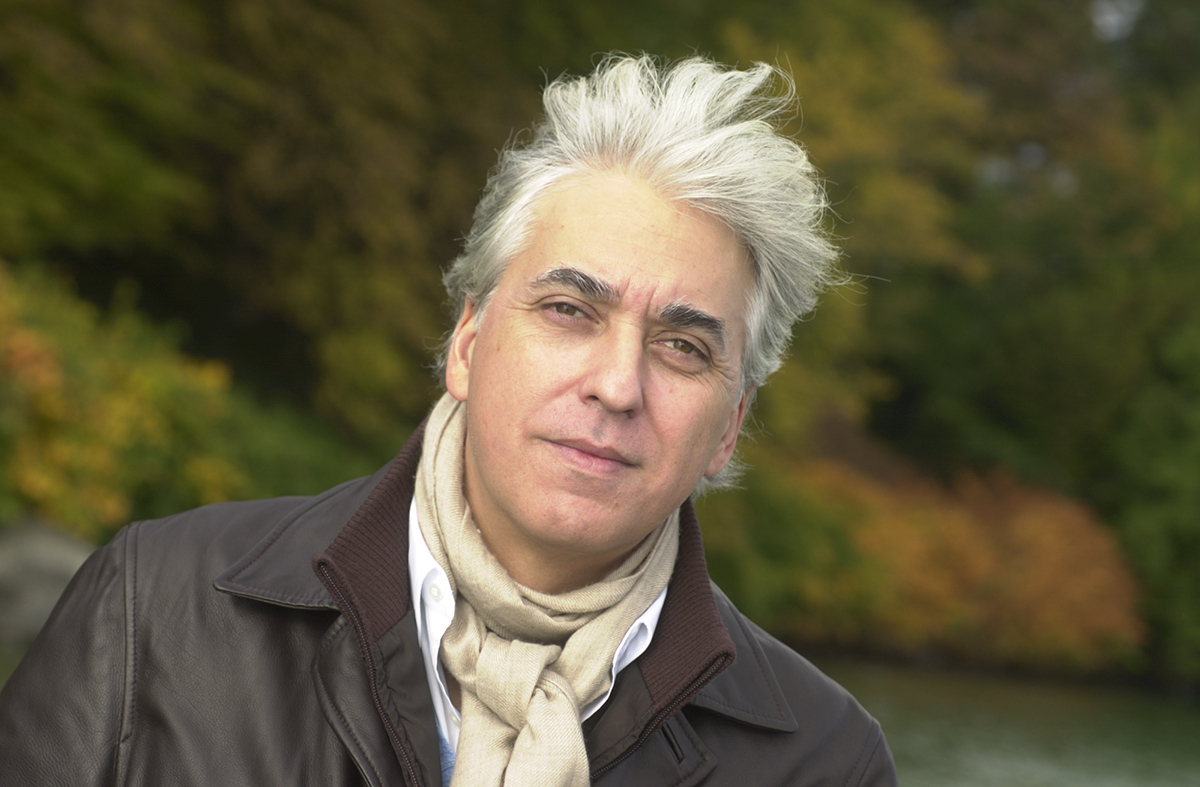
- Patrick Mimran in 2004
- Born: 1956 (age 69–70); Paris, France

Patrick Mimran (born 1956 in Paris, France) is a contemporary French multimedia artist, composer, and the former CEO of Lamborghini. He is most widely known for Lamborghini's turn-around in the early 1980s and his art exhibit, "The Billboard Project".

== Biography ==
=== Business ===
==== Lamborghini: 1978-1987 ====
Before becoming an artist, Patrick Mimran was the owner and CEO of Lamborghini. In 1981, at the age of 24, Mimran and his brother, Jean Claude, purchased the company's failing assets for US$3 million. The brothers had purchased the company out of receivership by 1984 and began investing heavily in the company's expansion, developing a comprehensive restructuring program. Under the Mimrans' management, Lamborghini's model line was expanded from the Countach to include the Jalpa sports car and the LM002 off-road vehicle. Patrick served as CEO until 1987 when he sold the company to Chrysler.

=== Art ===
==== Multimedia artist: 1990-present ====
After years as a successful businessman, Mimran turned to art. Mimran's artwork has ranged through media including painting, photography, video art, sculpture, and installations. Mimran's work has been exhibited in museums including the Leonardo da Vinci Museum for Science and Technology, Palazzo Venezia and Kunstpalais Erlangen, as well as festivals including the Venice Architecture Biennale, Art Cologne, Art Paris and Art Karlsruhe.

===== Musical composition =====
He also works in electronic music, composing the score for Maurice Béjart’s ballet Kurozuka[3] (performed at the Bunkan Kalkan Theatre, Tokyo)[4] and collaborating with Peter Greenaway. Mimran composed scores for Greenaway projects including the multidisciplinary film and art installation "Stairs 1 Geneva", the 1996 film, The Pillow Book, the 1996 public art event "La Cosmologia di Piazza del Popolo Roma", and the art installation, "In the Dark", which was featured in the 1996 exhibition, "Spellbound: Art and Film" at the Hayward Gallery of London. In addition to musical scores, Mimran has released four albums. Novels For The Moons (1981), his first album, was heavily influenced by German electronic pioneers and released on the imprint Lamborghini Records. He subsequently released Back to Earth (1983), Honni Soit – Qui Mal Y Pense (1987) with vocalist James Bowman, and Service Entrance (2017), a collection of soft piano music.

===== Sculpture =====
Mimran's "Jet Set Giraffe" sculpture, standing at 7.5 meters, is considered the tallest giraffe sculpture in the world. It was installed in the Monte Carlo's Grand Casino Garden from 2009 to 2013, when it was moved to its permanent home at the Colchester Zoo in Essex, England. The giraffe, made of glass fiber and steel, appears to be solid metallic silver but transforms into a silhouette lit by 214 colorful lights at night.

===== The Billboard Project: 2000-2012 =====
Patrick Mimran is best known in the United States for his Billboard Project, a comprehensive series of billboards which he initiated in 2000 in London and later expanded to New York, Miami, Venice, and Tokyo. For the project, Mimran used advertisement billboards as a platform for short aphorisms that provided commentary about art and the relationships between artists, critics, curators and art dealers. The billboards attracted a fan base.

===== Wearable art =====
In 2015, Mimran turned 25 of his paintings into wearable art by developing the cashmere scarf line, Allezzou Fashion.

===== Digital art =====
Around 2017 Mimran developed the Aphos App, a digital rendition of his "Billboard Project" which allows users anywhere in the world to create their own boards with quotes, aphorisms, and comments about art, politics, news, fashion, music, or any subject related to their daily lives and interests.

== Exhibits ==
2013
L'art prend la ville !, DeFacto Gallery, La defense, Paris, France
Billboard Project, Istituto degli Innocenti, Mudi, Piazza SS Annunziata 12, Florence, Italy
GHOSTS, Recent paintings, Palazzo Malipiero, Ramo Malipiero, Venice, Italy
IN THE MIROR OF REALITY, La galleria, Venice, Italy
2012
iRonic, Bietigheim-Bissingen
Trash Can Project, Campo san manuele, Venice, Italy
After, New Photographs, Palazzo Malipiero, Venice, Italy
2011
Ironic. Die feinsinnige Ironie der Kunst, Kunstpalais
Patrick Mimran billboard, Palais Stutterheim, Erlangen, Germany
Patrick Mimran, Group Show, Galerie Dorothea van der Koelen
Art in movimento, La Galeria Venezia
After, New Photographs, Palazzo Malipiero, Venice, Italy
Patrick Mimran, Photographs, Art Paris 2011
Paul Ardenne, Realite revisitee, Analix Forever
Patrick Mimran, Billboard Project, Galerie Dorothea van der Koelen, Art Cologne
Patrick Mimran, Billboard Project, Galerie Dorothea van der Koelen, Art Karlsruhe
2010
Nuit Blanche, Billboard project, Toronto, Canada
La Galleria, Photos of my billboard project, Dorothea van der Koelen, Venice, Italy
2009
Trash Can Project, Campo san manuele, Venice, Italy, Museo Nazionale Scienza e Tecnologia Leonardo da Vinci
Patrick Mimran, Billboard project, Milan, Italy
Patrick Mimran, Billboard project, Galerie Dorothea Van der koelen, Italy
Les Photaumnales, Musee departemental de la haute-garonne, Beauvais oise France
Patrick Mimran, car park in New York
2008
11th Mostra internazionale di architecttura La biennale di Venezia, Billboards in the city, Venice, Italy
Patrick Mimran Billboard Project, Museo Nazionale Scienza e Tecnologia Leonardo da Vinci, Milan, Italy
Prelevements Urbains, Le mois de la photo à Paris, Passage de Retz, Paris, France
Patrick Mimran “Temple Steps” recent photographs, Bay 100, Miami, USA
2007
Billboard project, 24th 25th 26th street, 31, Chelsea, New York, USA
Recent Paintings Muramatsu Gallery, Tokyo, Japan Billboard Project Tokyo, Japan
New York Parkings, Palazzo Malipiero, Venice, Italy
Trash Can Project, Campo san manuele, Venice, Italy
Lyon Billboard Project, Lyon, France
Brahmatic A video Installation, National Museum Leonardo da vinci, Milan, Italy
Recent paintings, video and photographs, Palazzo Venezia, Rome, Italy
Vertigo revisited a Video Installation, Kent Gallery, Miami, USA Biennale de Florence, Florence, Italy
2006
Installation video paintings and photographs
Brahmatic, Solo show, Moscow world fine art fair, Moscow, Russia
Billboard project, 20 billboards in Moscow, Moscow, Russia
Billboard project, 24th 25th 26th street, Chelsea, New York, USA
Billboard project, Bridge of the Academia, Venice, Italy
Billboard project, Piazza del Popolo, Roma, Italy
Billboard project, Museo d’arte moderna, Bologna, Italy
2005
Billboard project, Bridge of the Academia, Venice, Italy
Billboard project 24th 25th 26th street, Chelsea, New York, USA
2004
Brahmâtic, Fondazione Querini Stampalia, Venice, Italy
Altered states, The Milk Studio, New York, USA
Billboard project, Bridge of the Academia, Venice, Italy
Billboard project, 24th 25th 26th street, Chelsea, New York, USA
L’oeuf” 2nd international biennale of sculpture of Monte-Carlo, Montecarlo, Monaco
2003
The Tower of Babel, Eggenberg Palace, Graz, Austria
Babel.TV" Group exhibition displaying, Graz, Austria
Discomatic, Espace Bellevue, Biarritz, France
Discomatic, Museo Valenciano de la Ilustracion y la Modernidad, Valencia, Spain
Billboard project Museo di Ca' Pesaro, Venice, Italy
Billboard project, 24th 25th 26th street, Chelsea, New York, USA
Paintings, Museo Nacional De Artes Visuales, Parque Rodó, Montevideo, Uruguay
Vertigo, Circulo de Bellas Artes Alcala 42, Madrid, Spain
2002
Vertigo, The Game in 20th Century Art, Palacio de Montemuzo, Zaragoza Spain
Billboard project, 24th 25th 26th street, Chelsea, New York, USA
Jet Set Giraffe, The Parade of Animals Second edition of the International Sculpture, Festival of Monte-Carlo Jardins du Casino, Monte Carlo, Monaco
Vertigo, Games in the Art of the 20th century, Espace Bellevue, Biarritz, France
2001
Babel.TV, Marlborough Chelsea, New York, USA
Babel.TV, Orangerie de Bagatelle, Paris, France
Billboard Project, West 24th and West 26th Street between 10th and 11th Avenues, Chelsea, New York, USA
2000
Paintings for billboard, Cromwell Road, London, Great Britain
First Baby, Walking Man, From Rodin to Mimran, Jardin du Palais Royal, Paris, France
Walking Man, From Rodin to Mimran, Lange Voorhoot, The Hague, The Netherlands
1999
Recent Paintings, Marlborough Gallery, New York, USA
The rhythm of time, The Almodin, Valencia, Spain
1996
Paintings, Marlborough Gallery New York, NY
1971
Sweet Murder, Galerie Laudann, Lausanne, Switzerland
Sweet Murder, Maison des jeunes et de la culture, Thonon les bains, France

== Bibliography ==
- Paul Ardenne, Patrick Mimran, partage des correspondances, Editions du Regard, Paris, 2001.
- Paul Ardenne, Babel/TV, Editions du Regard, 2001.
- Urban Samples/Prélèvements urbains (photographies), Editions Monografik, 2008.
- Beate Reifenscheid and Dorothea van der Koelen; Arte in Movimento – Kunst in Bewegung, Dokumente unserer Zeit XXXIV; Chorus-Verlag; Mainz 2011; ISBN 978-3-926663-44-3
