= Pamela Stretton =

South African artist (born 1980)

- Born: 1980; South Africa
- Education: Rhodes University; University of Cape Town
- Awards: Sanlam Vuleka 2005
- Website: www.pamelastretton.com

Pamela Stretton (born 1980) is a South African artist whose work deals predominantly with the female body. Her main medium is digital inkjet prints that combine text and photographs. Originally from Cape Town, South Africa, Stretton moved to the United Kingdom.

Stretton attended Kingswood College, Grahamstown and Queenstown Girls High School.

She received a Bachelor of Fine Art (with distinction) from Rhodes University in 2002 and a Master of Fine Art (with distinction) from the University of Cape Town in 2005.

== Career ==
Stretton's work deals predominantly with the female form and its commodification, beautification, and role in popular culture. Most of her works are digital inkjet prints that combine photographic images and text; they are composites of barcodes, labels, and advertisements that create a larger image of the female form. The pieces are largely autobiographical, but also carry general themes about popular culture, fashion, health, and food. The painstaking and meticulous creation of each piece references obsessive eating disorders. Similarly, the grid mechanism portrays the pressures of conformity. Her style has been called a female version of Chuck Close.

== Awards and honors ==
Stretton was a finalist for the Absa L'Atelier Art Competition in 2003, 2006 and 2007. In 2005, she won the Sanlam Vuleka Art Competition and was a finalist for the Brett Kebble Art Awards. The Vuleka was established in 1963 and is Southern Africa's oldest continuous art competition.

She was also a finalist for the inaugural Spier Contemporary Competition and Exhibition in 2007, which Smithsonian Libraries describes as juried. The Spier Contemporary was a national biennale competition and exhibit for visual artists and was the largest competition of its kind in South Africa.
