= Abraham Amigo =

Sepharadi rabbi

- Born: c. 1610; Constantinople or Adrianople
- Died: c. 1683 (about age 73)
- Occupation: Author
- Notable work: Peri Hadash

Abraham Amigo (c. 1610-c. 1683) was a noted rabbi of Sepharadi descent. He lived in Palestine during the middle of the seventeenth century CE. Abraham was a contemporary of Moses ben Nissim Benveniste, the younger, author of the responsa, Sefer Pene Mosheh.

Amigo migrated to the region in 1655, and settled in Jerusalem where he became friends with Jacob ben Hayyim Zemah. For his piety and learning, Amigo was highly respected by his contemporaries. He wrote Peri Hadash (New Fruit), a commentary on the subdivision Orah Hayyim of the Shulchan Aruch, from the laws of the Passover to the end. The work has been lost. Amigo was also the author of a large work, containing responsa as well as novellæ to the Talmud and the halakhic literature, which came under the notice of Azulai.
