= Pawn Shop Chronicles =

- Theatrical & On-Demand release poster
- Directed by: Wayne Kramer
- Written by: Adam Minarovich
- Produced by: Jordan Schur; Paul Walker; David Mimran; Nick Thurlow
- Starring: Brendan Fraser; Elijah Wood; Vincent D'Onofrio; Thomas Jane; Lukas Haas; Norman Reedus; Matt Dillon; Paul Walker
- Cinematography: Jim Whitaker
- Edited by: Sarah Boyd
- Music by: The Newton Brothers
- Production companies: Anchor Bay Films; Mimran Schur Pictures
- Distributed by: Anchor Bay Films
- Release date: July 12, 2013
- Running time: 112 minutes
- Country: United States
- Language: English
- Box office: $10,080 (limited release)

Pawn Shop Chronicles, also known as Hustlers, is a 2013 American crime comedy film directed by Wayne Kramer and written by Adam Minarovich. The film stars an ensemble cast, led by Paul Walker, Elijah Wood, Matt Dillon, Brendan Fraser, Vincent D'Onofrio, Norman Reedus, and Chi McBride. This was Walker's last film to be released during his lifetime, as he died four months after its release.

The film received a limited theatrical release in July 2013.

== Plot ==
Centering on the events in and around a pawn shop, Pawn Shop Chronicles tells three overlapping stories involving items found within said pawn shop.

=== Part 1 ===
Vernon pawns his shotgun for $20 then meets up with Raw Dog in a field. Raw Dog is angry at Vernon because he believes they can’t rob Stanley, the local drug dealer, without a gun. Randy arrives and runs Vernon over with his truck because Randy mistakenly believes that Vernon stole money from him. Leaving Vernon for dead, Raw Dog and Randy then travel to Lamar’s to try and get a weapon to rob Stanley, but are unsuccessful. On their way home, they are run off the road by Richard and Cyndi. After nearly crashing in the woods, they manage to steal a bow from a hunter. Vernon then wakes up and The Man’s car shows up seemingly out of nowhere. The Man then arms Vernon with a new shotgun. Raw Dog and Randy try to rob Stanley, but Stanley immediately recognizes them as they are daily customers. Vernon then shows up with the shotgun and in the ensuing gunfight, Stanley’s drug lab explodes killing Stanley, Raw Dog, Randy, and Vernon.

=== Part 2 ===
Alton, the owner of the pawnshop, is chased by a big black truck after he flips the driver off. Alton then decides to sell his car in order to avoid any more trouble with the truck. Richard then tries to pawn his fiancés (Sandy) wedding ring claiming to have lost his wallet. However, before he completes the transaction, he sees his original wife’s (Cyndi) wedding ring in the pawnshop case. Richard claims Cyndi was kidnapped year earlier and after pressuring Alton for information, swaps Sandy’s ring for Cyndi’s, Alton’s car, and information on who gave Alton Cyndi’s ring which turns out to be JJ. Richard then abandons Sandy in order to search for Cyndi. Richard tortures JJ at his restaurant who says he stole Cyndi’s ring from his uncle. JJ’s uncles says that he won Cyndi’s ring from Johny Shaw. After a fight with JJ’s uncle, Richard steals a gun from his house and heads to Johnny’s house. After seeing a picture of Cyndi on Johnny’s refrigerator, Richard tortures Johnny into confessing. Johnny is a sexual predator who kidnaps and enslaves women. After finding Cyndi and other women living in dog kennels, Richard seemingly kills Johnny. Before leaving, Richard frees all of Johnny’s victims who are largely catatonic, and they wander nude through the town. As Richard and Cyndi drive away, Richard tells Cyndi that he killed Johnny. Cyndi, suffering from severe Stockholm syndrome, stabs Richard causing them to veer into oncoming traffic (which causes Raw Dog and Randy to crash earlier in the film). Cyndi and Richard both die from the crash and their wounds.

=== Part 3 ===
Ricky is a down on his luck Elvis impersonator in town for a gig at the fair. After his girlfriend leaves him, he decides to sell his authentic, gold Elvis medallion to Alton in order to pay for enough gas to get to the gig. On the way to the fair, Ricky notices that his sideburns are uneven and so decides to stop and get a haircut but he must choose between two barber shops which exist side by side (Doc’s and Cooks). A crowd gathers to watch him make his decision. Ricky initially chooses Doc’s, but after Doc makes Ricky’s sideburn worse, he changes shops to Cooks. This causes a riot outside the two barber shops. Cook, after learning that Ricky has already been to Doc’s, cuts the back of Ricky’s neck. Ricky then leaves. With the show now approaching, Ricky heads to the liquor store. There, an old man is playing blues on a guitar. As Ricky listens to him, Virgil, a street preacher, offers to make his dreams come true if he will give his soul to the devil. Ricky initially leaves without accepting Virgil’s offer, but at the fair, after the show goes badly, he sells his soul and his performance turns around. During the show, Johnny’s victims appear draped in American flags and become part of the show. After the show, Ricky is offered a contract to play at fairs throughout the country and leaves. Johnny, now looking like a corpse, then inexplicably appears and reclaims his victims. In the final scene, Alton is beaten with a bat by the driver of the black truck that chased him earlier in the film. JJ ends up saving him, having recovered Cyndi’s ring after she threw it out the window. JJ hawks the ring to Alton for 40 dollars.

== Cast ==
- Brendan Fraser as Ricky
- Elijah Wood as Johnny Shaw
- Vincent D'Onofrio as Alton
- Thomas Jane as The Man
- Lukas Haas as Vernon
- Norman Reedus as Stanley
- Matt Dillon as Richard
- Paul Walker as Raw Dog
- Kevin Rankin as Randy
- Chi McBride as Johnson
- DJ Qualls as JJ
- Pell James as Cyndi
- Sam Hennings as Virgil
- Ashlee Simpson as Theresa
- Michael Cudlitz as Ben
- Rachelle Lefevre as Sandy
- Mark Povinelli as Harry
- Marc Macaulay as Cook

== Production ==
Fred Durst was originally set to direct.

The movie was filmed in Baton Rouge, Louisiana, in June 2012. The film's carnival scene was filmed at William and Lee Park in Port Allen, Louisiana.

== Critical reception ==
On Rotten Tomatoes it has a 18% approval rating based on reviews from 17 critics. On Metacritic the film has a score of 26 out 100 based on reviews from 10 critics, indicating "generally unfavorable reviews".

Variety called it "A sub-Tarantino triptych of comic-violent tall tales consisting mostly of bad things happening to dumb people." Stephen Holden of The New York Times, said of the film, "Hee Haw meets Pulp Fiction at the meth lab: That describes the style of Pawn Shop Chronicles, a hillbilly grindhouse yawp of a movie that belches in your face and leaves a sour stink."

The film was reviewed favorably by JoBlo.com. For the site, reviewer JimmyO wrote, "Pawn Shop Chronicles is a wildly bizarre and politically incorrect mix of b-movie genres wrapped into one. Kramer – with the script by Minarovich – amps up the action and violence without pushing it too far – well at least for my personally warped taste."
