= Michel Mimran =

Michel Mimran (born Michael Michel Mimran, 1954) is a French - luxemburgish architect, artist and member of the artistic circle of Luxembourg. He's been actively working around the subject of perception and memory.

== Biography ==
Studied architecture in Paris, and later on was accepted into the Ecole Nationale Supérieure des Beaux-Arts of Paris. Mimran graduated from both universities, with one degree in architecture (1978) and another in arts (1976)

After working in several architecture offices, Mimran started his own architecture agency, specializing in rehabilitions, heavy renovations of office, activity and residential buildings. With his first works on the Bercy train station, he combined art and science by showing via a photographic process the methodical cutting in "slices" of an urban space, a process concomitant of tomography. Since 1993 he has dedicated himself exclusively to art. With new technologies, he develops his researches on painting, photography and music. He has created a series of computer-generated animations.

== Works ==
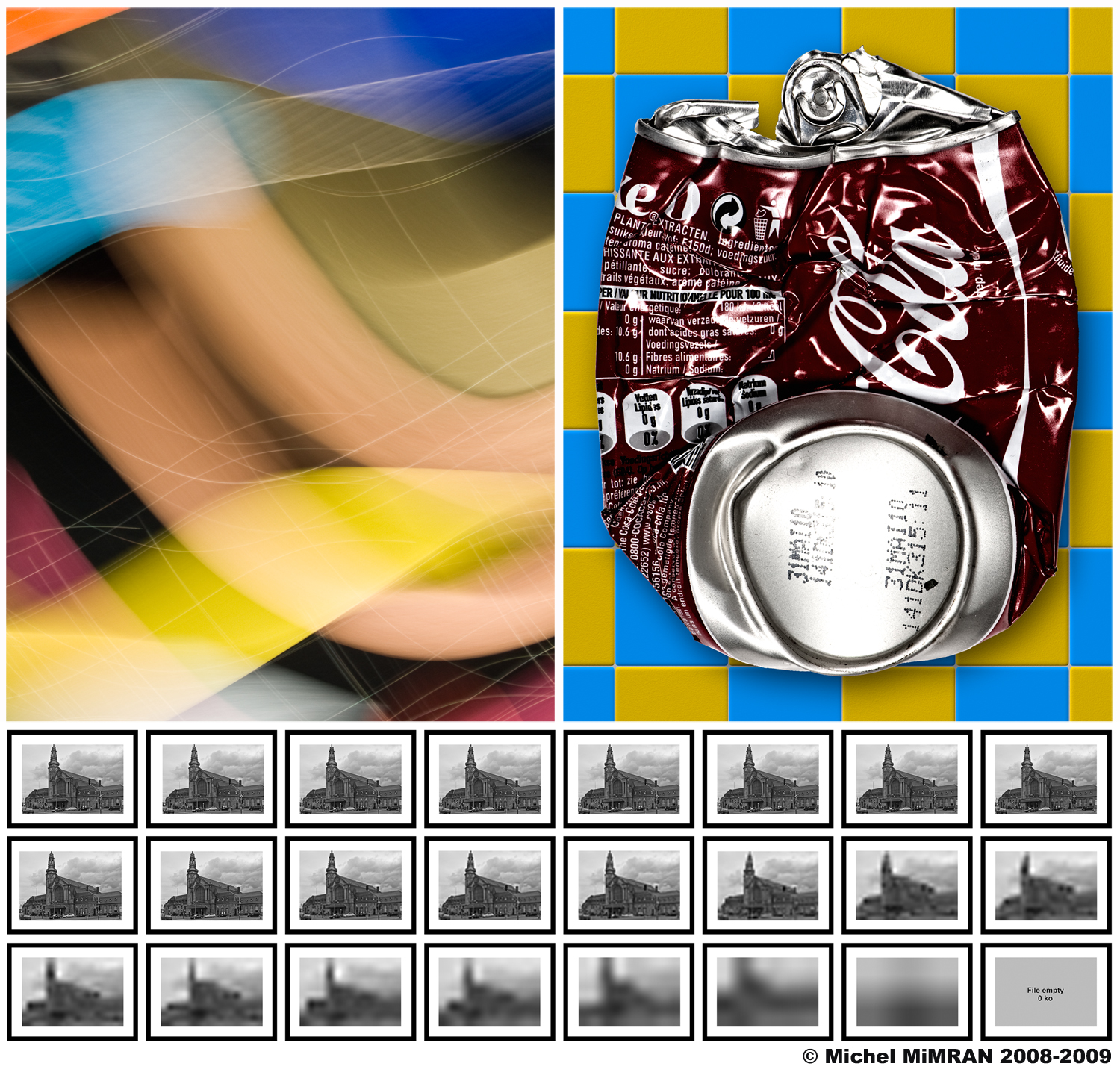
"Fotoforms, Crash in the Kitchen, Memoria: La gare de Luxembourg, le 11 juillet 2009"

Mimran has been working since 1974 on the subject of perception and memory. His artistic works revolve around the exploration of every aspect of memory. A memory that he classifies in three categories: the temporal memory, the movement memory and the cultural memory. His first work surrounding perception and memory took place on the former Bercy railway station in Paris, and consisted in cutting a space, limited by a photographic frame, in "slices". 96 photographs showing 96 different spaces. He also cut in "slices" a 360° photographic field. In 1976, he realizes two works requiring a "participative photography" at the Porte Dorée in Paris.

Meanwhile, he starts his first "Fotoforms" colors in an argentic system in order to explore the "movement memory". In 1995, he's selected for a serie of magnifying-glasses paintings at "95 : Luxembourg : European city of culture". In the 90's, he creates computer-generated images that are exhibited on a flat screen at the villa Vauban in Luxembourg in 2003.

In summer 2005 during his stay at the Grand Hôtel (Cabourg), he takes a picture of a scene that will inspire him a work on Proust’s idea of memory. This work, entitled "Cabourg 2006, hommage à Proust" was exhibited at the Grand Théâtre of Luxembourg the following year.

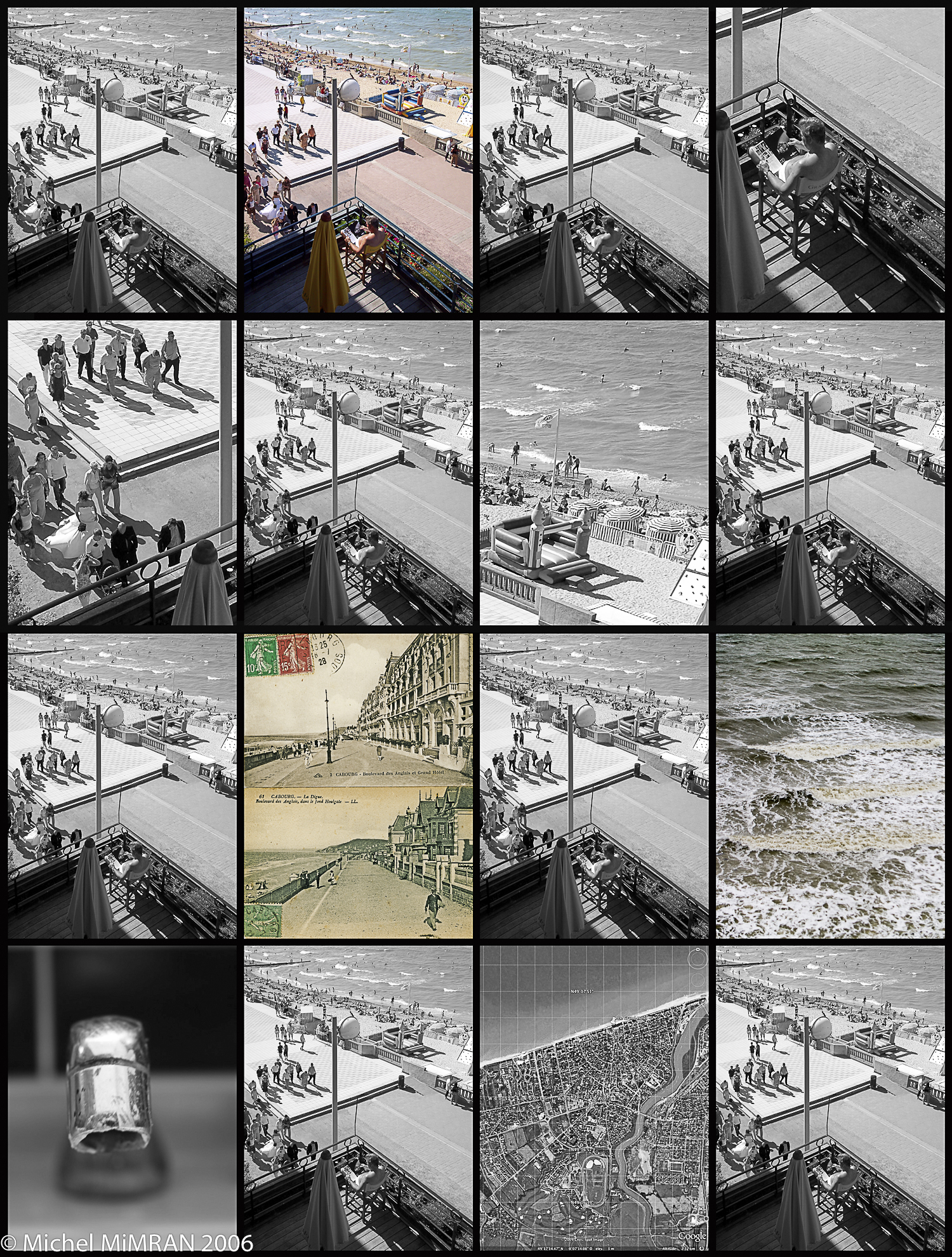
"Cabourg 2006, Hommage à Proust"

In 2005 he goes back to his "Fotoforms" and reaches his goal concerning the movement memory, thanks to digital photography. Those "Fotoforms" were exhibited in 2009 at the Tuchfabrik in Trier and are still exhibited at the Olympus gallery. In 2009 the foreseeing transformation of Luxembourg's railway station inspires him a work on temporal memory called "Memoria: La Gare de Luxembourg, le 11 Juillet 2009". This series of 24 photographs was exhibited at the Carrérotondes in Luxembourg.

Since 2008, he has orientated his researches towards cultural memory with a series of pictures mixing photography, computer-generated images and drawings, entitled "Crash in the Kitchen" and "Flower on the Floor". Those works were exhibited at the Credit Suisse Gallery in Luxembourg city In March 2011, his new photographs were exhibited at the Abbaye de Neumünster Currently, in "Wellington-Picadilly", he's using Google Earth and geolocalization as a tool in his work.

Michel Mimran also participated in non-profit organizations such as Kiwanis and Autistes sans Frontières by offering some original pieces for auction. In 2012 Autistes sans frontières asked 56 international artists to give away an original artpiece to raise funds for children with autism.

== Exhibitions ==
- 1976: Musée Berryer, France
- 1995: Luxembourg, European City of Culture
- 2003: Villa Vauban, Luxembourg
- 2005: Grand Théâtre of Luxembourg
- 2006: Grand Théâtre of Luxembourg
- 2009: Tuchfabrik Trier, Germany
- 2009: Carrérotondes Luxembourg
- 2010: Crédit Suisse Luxembourg
- 2010: Popart88
- 2011: Abbaye de Neumünster
- 2012: Antwerp Accessible Art Fair

== Bibliography ==
- The Memory, an artistic journey Michel Mimran (ISBN 978-99959-764-0-8), 2012.
