= David Mimran =

American film producer

David Mimran is a film producer and businessman.

Mimran is the son of Jean Claude Mimran, a billionaire in the sugar industry.

== Career ==
Mimran produced a number of films including Warrior, Stone, and Pawn Shop Chronicles. In 2015, he became the CEO of his family's Mimran Group, and the primary stakeholder in Canada's Teranga Gold.

Mimran signed a deal with Lionsgate to co-finance a number of films. This includes the production of Warrior, The Kid, and Rapture-Palooza.

In August 2022, Mimran resigned as a non-executive director of Endeavor Mining.
