= List of acts of the 1st session of the 59th Parliament of the United Kingdom =

This is a list of acts of the 1st session of the 59th Parliament of the United Kingdom, which began on 9 July 2024 and has not yet concluded.

Acts passed since 1963 are cited by calendar year, as opposed to the convention used for earlier acts of citing the regnal year(s) in which the relevant parliamentary session was held. Each act passed in a respective year is given a chapter number (abbreviated "c."), denoted by Arabic numerals in the case of public general acts, lowercase Roman numerals in the case of local acts, or italicised Arabic numerals in the case of personal acts. These run as separate series.

47 acts of Parliament have so far been passed by the 59th Parliament in its 1st session: 45 public general acts and 2 local acts.

indicates that an act has been transcribed on Wikisource, indicates that an act is available to view at legislation.gov.uk, and indicates the location of the original act in the Parliamentary Archives.

== Public general acts ==
Short title	Citation	Royal assent
Long title
Supply and Appropriation (Main Estimates) Act 2024	2024 c. 23	30 July 2024
An Act to authorise the use of resources for the year ending with 31 March 2025; to authorise both the issue of sums out of the Consolidated Fund and the application of income for that year; and to appropriate the supply authorised for that year by this Act and by the Supply and Appropriation (Anticipation and Adjustments) Act 2024. (Note: Supply and Appropriation (Anticipation and Adjustment) Act 2024 (c. 4))
Budget Responsibility Act 2024	2024 c. 24	10 September 2024
An Act to impose duties on the Treasury and the Office for Budget Responsibility in respect of the announcement of fiscally significant measures.
Passenger Railway Services (Public Ownership) Act 2024	2024 c. 25	28 November 2024
An Act to make provision for passenger railway services to be provided by public sector companies instead of by means of franchises.
Lords Spiritual (Women) Act 2015 (Extension) Act 2025	2025 c. 1	15 January 2025
An Act to extend the period within which vacancies among the Lords Spiritual are to be filled by bishops who are women.
Commonwealth Parliamentary Association and International Committee of the Red Cross (Status) Act 2025	2025 c. 2	15 January 2025
An Act to make provision about the status of, and privileges and immunities in connection with, the Commonwealth Parliamentary Association and the International Committee of the Red Cross; and for connected purposes.
Financial Assistance to Ukraine Act 2025	2025 c. 3	15 January 2025
An Act to make provision for loans or other financial assistance to be provided to, or for the benefit of, the government of Ukraine.
Arbitration Act 2025	2025 c. 4	24 February 2025
An Act to amend the Arbitration Act 1996 (Note: Arbitration Act 1996 (c. 23)); and for connected purposes.
Water (Special Measures) Act 2025	2025 c. 5	24 February 2025
An Act to make provision about the regulation, governance and special administration of water companies.
Supply and Appropriation (Anticipation and Adjustments) Act 2025	2025 c. 6	11 March 2025
An Act to authorise the use of resources for the years ending with 31 March 2024, 31 March 2025 and 31 March 2026; to authorise the issue of sums out of the Consolidated Fund for those years; and to appropriate the supply authorised by this Act for the years ending with 31 March 2024 and 31 March 2025.
Crown Estate Act 2025	2025 c. 7	11 March 2025
An Act to amend the Crown Estate Act 1961. (Note: Crown Estate Act 1961 (c.55))
Finance Act 2025	2025 c. 8	20 March 2025
An Act to make provision about finance.
Church of Scotland (Lord High Commissioner) Act 2025	2025 c. 9	3 April 2025
An Act to make provision for persons of the Roman Catholic faith to be eligible to hold the office of His Majesty’s High Commissioner to the General Assembly of the Church of Scotland.
Terrorism (Protection of Premises) Act 2025	2025 c. 10	3 April 2025
An Act to require persons with control of certain premises or events to take steps to reduce the vulnerability of the premises or event to, and the risk of physical harm to individuals arising from, acts of terrorism; to confer related functions on the Security Industry Authority; to limit the disclosure of information about licensed premises that is likely to be useful to a person committing or preparing an act of terrorism; and for connected purposes.
National Insurance Contributions (Secondary Class 1 Contributions) Act 2025	2025 c. 11	3 April 2025
An Act to make provision about secondary Class 1 contributions.
Non-Domestic Rating (Multipliers and Private Schools) Act 2025	2025 c. 12	3 April 2025
An Act to make provision for, and in connection with, the introduction of higher non-domestic rating multipliers as regards large business hereditaments, and lower non-domestic rating multipliers as regards retail, hospitality and leisure hereditaments, in England and for the removal of charitable relief from non-domestic rates for private schools in England.
Steel Industry (Special Measures) Act 2025	2025 c. 13	12 April 2025
An Act to make provision about powers to secure the continued and safe use of assets of a steel undertaking.
Institute for Apprenticeships and Technical Education (Transfer of Functions etc) Act 2025	2025 c. 14	15 May 2025
An Act to transfer the functions of the Institute for Apprenticeships and Technical Education (Note: Institute for Apprenticeships and Technical Education), and its property, rights and liabilities, to the Secretary of State; to abolish the Institute; and to make amendments relating to the transferred functions.
Bank Resolution (Recapitalisation) Act 2025	2025 c. 15	15 May 2025
An Act to make provision about recapitalisation costs in relation to the special resolution regime under the Banking Act 2009.
Great British Energy Act 2025	2025 c. 16	15 May 2025
An Act to make provision about Great British Energy.
Sentencing Guidelines (Pre-sentence Reports) Act 2025	2025 c. 17	19 June 2025
An Act to make provision about sentencing guidelines in relation to pre-sentence reports.
Data (Use and Access) Act 2025	2025 c. 18	19 June 2025
An Act to make provision about access to customer data and business data; to make provision about services consisting of the use of information to ascertain and verify facts about individuals; to make provision about the recording and sharing, and keeping of registers, of information relating to apparatus in streets; to make provision about the keeping and maintenance of registers of births and deaths; to make provision for the regulation of the processing of information relating to identified or identifiable living individuals; to make provision about privacy and electronic communications; to establish the Information Commission; to make provision about information standards for health and social care; to make provision about the grant of smart meter communication licences; to make provision about the disclosure of information to improve public service delivery; to make provision about the retention of information by providers of internet services in connection with investigations into child deaths; to make provision about providing information for purposes related to the carrying out of independent research into online safety matters; to make provision about the retention of biometric data; to make provision about services for the provision of electronic signatures, electronic seals and other trust services; to make provision about works protected by copyright and the development of artificial intelligence systems; to make provision about the creation of purported intimate images; and for connected purposes.
Supply and Appropriation (Main Estimates) Act 2025	2025 c. 19	21 July 2025
An Act to authorise the use of resources for the year ending with 31 March 2026; to authorise both the issue of sums out of the Consolidated Fund and the application of income for that year; and to appropriate the supply authorised for that year by this Act and by the Supply and Appropriation (Anticipation and Adjustments) Act 2025.
Product Regulation and Metrology Act 2025	2025 c. 20	21 July 2025
An Act to make provision about the marketing or use of products in the United Kingdom; about units of measurement and the quantities in which goods are marketed in the United Kingdom; and for connected purposes.
Football Governance Act 2025	2025 c. 21	21 July 2025
An Act to establish the Independent Football Regulator; to make provision for the licensing of football clubs; to make provision about the distribution of revenue received by organisers of football competitions; and for connected purposes.
Universal Credit Act 2025	2025 c. 22	3 September 2025
An Act to make provision to alter the rates of the standard allowance, limited capability for work element and limited capability for work and work-related activity element of universal credit and the rates of income-related employment and support allowance.
Armed Forces Commissioner Act 2025	2025 c. 23	3 September 2025
An Act to establish, and confer functions on, the Armed Forces Commissioner; to abolish the office of Service Complaints Ombudsman; and for connected purposes.
Bus Services Act 2025	2025 c. 24	27 October 2025
An Act to make provision about local and school bus services; and for connected purposes.
Deprivation of Citizenship Orders (Effect during Appeal) Act 2025	2025 c. 25	27 October 2025
An Act to make provision about the effect, during an appeal, of an order under section 40 of the British Nationality Act 1981. (Note: British Nationality Act 1981 (c. 61))
Renters’ Rights Act 2025	2025 c. 26	27 October 2025
An Act to make provision changing the law about rented homes, including provision abolishing fixed term assured tenancies and assured shorthold tenancies; imposing obligations on landlords and others in relation to rented homes and temporary and supported accommodation; and for connected purposes.
Absent Voting (Elections in Scotland and Wales) Act 2025	2025 c. 27	27 October 2025
An Act to make provision about absent voting in connection with local government elections in Scotland and Wales, elections to the Scottish Parliament and elections to Senedd Cymru; and for connected purposes.
Public Authorities (Fraud, Error and Recovery) Act 2025	2025 c. 28	2 December 2025
An Act to make provision about the prevention of fraud against public authorities and the making of erroneous payments by public authorities; about the recovery of money paid by public authorities as a result of fraud or error; and for connected purposes.
Property (Digital Assets etc) Act 2025	2025 c. 29	2 December 2025
An Act to make provision about the types of things that are not prevented from being objects of personal property rights.
Animal Welfare (Import of Dogs, Cats and Ferrets) Act 2025	2025 c. 30	2 December 2025
An Act to make provision for and in connection with restricting the importation and non-commercial movement of dogs, cats and ferrets.
Border Security, Asylum and Immigration Act 2025	2025 c. 31	2 December 2025
An Act to make provision about border security; to make provision about immigration and asylum; to make provision about sharing customs data and trailer registration data; to make provision about articles for use in serious crime; to make provision about serious crime prevention orders; to make provision about fees paid in connection with the recognition, comparability or assessment of qualifications; and for connected purposes.
Dogs (Protection of Livestock) (Amendment) Act 2025	2025 c. 32	18 December 2025
An Act to make provision changing the law about the offence of livestock worrying, including changes to what constitutes an offence and increased powers for investigation of suspected offences; and for connected purposes.
Mental Health Act 2025	2025 c. 33	18 December 2025
An Act to make provision to amend the Mental Health Act 1983 (Note: Mental Health Act 1983 (c. 20)) in relation to mentally disordered persons; and for connected purposes.
Planning and Infrastructure Act 2025	2025 c. 34	18 December 2025
An Act to make provision about infrastructure; to make provision about town and country planning; to make provision for a scheme, administered by Natural England, for a nature restoration levy payable by developers; to make provision about development corporations; to make provision about the compulsory purchase of land; to make provision about environmental outcomes reports; and for connected purposes.
Space Industry (Indemnities) Act 2025	2025 c. 35	18 December 2025
An Act to require operator licences authorising the carrying out of spaceflight activities to specify the licensee’s indemnity limit.
Employment Rights Act 2025	2025 c. 36	18 December 2025
An Act to make provision to amend the law relating to employment rights; to make provision about procedure for handling redundancies; to make provision about the treatment of workers involved in the supply of services under certain public contracts; to provide for duties to be imposed on employers in relation to equality; to amend the definition of “employment business” in the Employment Agencies Act 1973 (Note: Employment Agencies Act 1973 (c. 35)); to provide for the establishment of the School Support Staff Negotiating Body and Social Care Negotiating Bodies; to amend the Seafarers’ Wages Act 2023 (Note: Seafarers' Wages Act 2023 (c. 8)); to make provision for the implementation of international agreements relating to maritime employment; to make provision about trade unions, industrial action, employers’ associations and the functions of the Certification Officer; to make provision about the enforcement of legislation relating to the labour market; and for connected purposes.
Unauthorised Entry to Football Matches Act 2026	2026 c. 1	22 January 2026
An Act to create an offence of unauthorised entry at football matches for which a football banning order can be imposed following conviction.
Sentencing Act 2026	2026 c. 2	22 January 2026
An Act to make provision about the sentencing, release and management after sentencing of offenders; to make provision about bail; to make provision about the removal from the United Kingdom of foreign criminals; and for connected purposes.
Holocaust Memorial Act 2026	2026 c. 3	22 January 2026
AAn Act to make provision for expenditure by the Secretary of State and the removal of restrictions in respect of certain land for or in connection with the construction of a Holocaust Memorial and Learning Centre.
Licensing Hours Extensions Act 2026	2026 c. 4	12 February 2026
An Act to amend the Licensing Act 2003 (Note: Licensing Act 2003 (c.17)) so that licensing hours orders can be made by negative resolution statutory instrument.
Secure 16 to 19 Academies Act 2026	2026 c. 5	12 February 2026
An Act to make provision about the notice period for termination of funding agreements for secure 16 to 19 Academies; to make provision about the Secretary of State’s duty to consider the impact on existing educational institutions when it is proposed to establish or expand a secure 16 to 19 Academy; and to alter the consultation question required when it is proposed to establish or expand a secure 16 to 19 Academy.
Biodiversity Beyond National Jurisdiction Act 2026	2026 c. 6	12 February 2026
An Act to make provision for and in connection with the implementation by the United Kingdom of the Agreement under the United Nations Convention on the Law of the Sea on the Conservation and Sustainable Use of Marine Biological Diversity of Areas Beyond National Jurisdiction.
Medical Training (Priortisation) Act 2026	2026 c. 7	5 March 2026
An Act to make provision about the prioritisation of graduates from medical schools in the United Kingdom and certain other persons for places on medical training programmes.
Rare Cancers Act 2026	2026 c. 8	5 March 2026
An Act to make provision to incentivise research and investment into the treatment of rare types of cancer; and for connected purposes.
Sustainable Aviation Fuel Act 2026	2026 c. 9	5 March 2026
An Act to make provision about sustainable aviation fuel.
Supply and Appropriation (Anticipation and Adjustments) Act 2026	2026 c. 10	18 March 2026
An Act to authorise the use of resources for the years ending with 31 March 2025, 31 March 2026 and 31 March 2027; to authorise the issue of sums out of the Consolidated Fund for those years; and to appropriate the supply authorised by this Act for the years ending with 31 March 2025 and 31 March 2026.
Finance Act 2026	2026 c. 11	18 March 2026
An Act to make provision in connection with finance.
House of Lords (Hereditary Peers) Act 2026	2026 c. 12	18 March 2026
An Act to remove the remaining connection between hereditary peerage and membership of the House of Lords; to make provision about resignation from the House of Lords; to abolish the jurisdiction of the House of Lords in relation to claims to hereditary peerages; and for connected purposes.
Universal Credit (Removal of Two Child Limit) Act 2026	2026 c. 13	18 March 2026
An Act to make provision to remove the two child limit on the child element of universal credit.
Industry and Exports (Financial Assistance) Act 2026	2026 c. 14	18 March 2026
An Act to Amend section 8(5) of the Industrial Development Act 1982 (Note: Industrial Development Act 1982 (c. 52)) and section 6 of the Export and Investment Guarantees Act 1991. (Note: Export and Investment Guarantees Act 1991 (c. 67))
National Insurance Contributions (Employer Pensions Contributions) Act 2026	2026 c. 15	29 April 2026
An Act to Make provision to amend section 4 of the Social Security Contributions and Benefits Act 1992, and section 4 of the Social Security Contributions and Benefits (Northern Ireland) Act 1992, so that amounts of salary sacrificed for employer pensions contributions pursuant to optional remuneration arrangements are liable to national insurance contributions.
Grenfell Tower Memorial (Expenditure) Act 2026	2026 c. 16	29 April 2026
An Act to Authorise the payment out of money provided by Parliament of expenditure incurred by the Secretary of State in connection with the commemoration of the victims of the fire at Grenfell Tower; and for connected purposes.
Ministerial Salaries (Amendment) Act 2026	2026 c. 17	29 April 2026
An Act to Make provision about the maximum number of salaries that may be paid under the Ministerial and other Salaries Act 1975 in respect of certain Ministerial offices.
Tobacco and Vapes Act 2026	2026 c. 18	29 April 2026
An Act to make provision about the supply of tobacco, vapes and other products, including provision prohibiting the sale of tobacco to people born on or after 1 January 2009 and provision about the licensing of retail sales and the registration of retailers; to enable product and information requirements to be imposed in connection with tobacco, vapes and other products; to control the advertising and promotion of tobacco, vapes and other products; and to make provision about smoke-free places, vape-free places and heated tobacco-free places.
Victims and Courts Act 2026	2026 c. 19	29 April 2026
An Act to Make provision about the experience of victims within the criminal justice system; about the functions of the Commissioner for Victims and Witnesses; and about procedure and the administration of criminal justice.
Crime and Policing Act 2026	2026 c. 20	29 April 2026
An Act to make provision about anti-social behaviour, offensive weapons, offences against people (including sexual offences), property offences, the criminal exploitation of persons, sex offenders, stalking and public order; to make provision about powers of the police, the border force and other similar persons; to make provision about confiscation; to make provision about the police; to make provision about terrorism and national security, and about international agreements relating to crime; to make provision about the criminal liability of bodies; and for connected purposes.
Children's Wellbeing and Schools Act 2026	2026 c. 21	29 April 2026
An Act to make provision about the safeguarding and welfare of children; about support for children in care or leaving care; about regulation of care workers; about regulation of establishments and agencies under Part 2 of the Care Standards Act 2000; about employment of children; about breakfast club provision and school uniform; about allergy safety in schools; about attendance of children at school; about regulation of independent educational institutions; about inspections of schools and colleges; about teacher misconduct; about Academies and teachers at Academies; repealing section 128 of the Education Act 2002; about school places and admissions; about establishing new schools; and for connected purposes.
Pension Schemes Act 2026	2026 c. 22	29 April 2026
An Act to make provision about pension schemes; and for connected purposes.
English Devolution and Community Empowerment Act 2026	2026 c. 23	29 April 2026
An Act to make provision about combined authorities, combined county authorities, the Greater London Authority, local councils, police and crime commissioners and fire and rescue authorities, local audit and terms in business tenancies about rent.

== Local acts ==
Short title	Citation	Royal assent
Long title
Norwich Livestock Market Act 2025	2025 c. i	21 July 2025
An Act to make provision for the relocation of Norwich Livestock Market; and for connected purposes.
General Cemetery Act 2025	2025 c. ii	27 October 2025
An Act to make new provision for the regulation and management of the General Cemetery Company upon its registration under the Companies Act 2006 (Note: Companies Act 2006 (c. 46)); to permit the transfer of the ownership and management of Kensal Green Cemetery and West London Crematorium to a charity; and to confer powers upon the General Cemetery Company to extinguish rights of burial and disturb human remains in Kensal Green Cemetery for the purpose of increasing the space for interments; and for connected purposes.
