= My Life My Say =

Charity in the United Kingdom

- Abbreviation: MLMS
- Formation: 2013
- Founder: Mete Coban MBE
- Type: Charity
- Purpose: Driving Youth Participation in Democracy
- Headquarters: Plexal, London
- Website: mylifemysay.org.uk

My Life My Say (MLMS) is a youth-led, non-partisan charity based in the United Kingdom.

== Common Futures Forum ==
The Common Futures Forum (CFF) is held at the end of each year whereby each of the Democracy Café attendees are invited to London for a full day of events and discussion. It was launched initially by the Mayor of London Sadiq Khan in 2018.

During the event, speakers are invited to explain their areas of expertise before engaging in a question-and-answer session with an event host. The day also includes lab sessions which test new ways of democratic engagement, encourage debates, and tools of productive discussion by hosting a panel of speakers in conversation with the audience about select topics.

The CFF in 2019 gathered social influencers such as Gina Martin who worked to make upskirting illegal and leaders of the technology sector such as Jurgen Maier to address the future world of work. Other speakers such as Lord Simon Woolley were invited to discuss the importance of youth engagement and leadership moving forward.

The organization's new Young Leaders 2020 initiative will use the months leading up to the CFF to train and directly involve young ambassadors across the UK to facilitate the end of year event.

== Advocacy ==
MLMS seeks to represent the views of young people to stakeholders and decision-makers at a local, national and international level. This work is based on the inception of the All-Party Parliamentary Group (APPG) on a Better Brexit for Young People (BBYP), which acts as an engagement platform between young people and decision-makers to ensure that youth voice is at the heart of the Brexit negotiations. The APPG's purpose is to involve young people in the Brexit negotiation process. The turnout among young people aged 18 to 24 in the EU referendum was almost double the level that has been widely reported since polling day, according to evidence compiled at the London School of Economics.

MLMS' Parliamentary privileges afforded by the APPG allows the charity to feed its events, such as Democracy Cafés, into the decision-making process and by doing so they can achieve tangible policy outcomes. This is demonstrated in MLMS' report, titled UK Youth Perspectives and Priorities for the Brexit Negotiations, which was released in October 2017.

MLMS recently implemented a new strategy to engage young people in democracy. This strategy is the Young Leaders 2020 programme which selects 20 people between the ages of 16 and 25 across the United Kingdom to be trained by a dozen of the organisation's sponsors and affiliates. The training ranges from public speaking and leadership to stakeholder management and community organising. The hope of this programme is to have a mutually beneficial relationship with the nation's young people who wish to not only be at the forefront of their community's most pressing political issues, but to boost their resume and jump into their work experience.

== Voter registration ==
MLMS has been campaigning to push voter registrations amongst 18-24 year olds since the snap election was called in 2017. Over 200,000 (of 308,000) people under the age of 35 registered to vote in the single day of November 22, 2019. My Life My Say's CEO, Mete Coban spoke about the importance of this vote saying: "This is the defining election for our generation. We are talking about making a decision with Brexit that is going to affect the direction the country goes in maybe for the whole of young people's lives". The Vote For Your Future (VFYF) campaign sent out teams of voting advocates including those representing My Life My Say on the final day of registration to encourage young people to have their say in the election In continuation of this initiative, MLMS also invited young people to the Common Futures Forum in November 2019 where debates, panel discussions and speakers presented their expertise on topics from artificial intelligence, upskirting and social influencing.

== Petitions ==
MLMS uses public petitions as a way to champion young people's voices. Till date, the charity has launched three petitions which have received over 888,000 signatures calling on the Government to act in the best interests of young people. These petitions included one directed to Theresa May, demanding answers about the public's confusion in the Brexit negotiations, two years after it was first announced. The other two petitions My Life My Say began were directed to Boris Johnson. One asking for a definitive ruling out of a no-deal Brexit before officially leaving the EU. The other requesting Johnson not to shut down Parliament in the hopes of avoiding the Government "to ram through an undemocratic Brexit" purely for the sake of putting an end to the drawn-out discussions.

Listen Up! Campaign: MLMS was involved in the initiative of raising signatures from 50 MPs promising to have discussions with 20 young constituents about Brexit. Stephen Kinnock MP spoke of the campaign: "Our duty as elected representatives of the people is yes, to exercise our own judgement but we should only do that having taken account of the views and priorities and concerns and hopes and fears of our constituents".

== Creation of MLMS ==
Cllr Mete Coban co-founded My Life My Say (MLMS) in 2013. He is most credited for setting up the All-Party Parliamentary Group on a Better Brexit for Young People and contributing to the increase of youth voter registration in the UK 2017 General Election through the national #TurnUp campaign. At the age of 21, Mete was elected as the youngest ever councillor in the London Borough of Hackney for Stoke Newington. He currently serves as the Deputy Mayor of London for Environment and Energy.

Coban was appointed a Member of the Order of the British Empire (MBE) in the 2020 New Year Honours for services to young people.
