= Stoke Newington (disambiguation) =

Stoke Newington is an area in London, England.

Stoke Newington may also refer to the following things associated with it:

- Stoke Newington (UK Parliament constituency)
- Stoke Newington (London County Council constituency)
- Stoke Newington (ward)
- Metropolitan Borough of Stoke Newington, a former district of the County of London
