= Steel Industry (Special Measures) Act 2025 =

Act of the Parliament of the United Kingdom

Steel Industry (Special Measures) Act 2025 (Note: Section 10(3).)
- Act of Parliament
- Parliament of the United Kingdom
- Long title: An act to make provision about powers to secure the continued and safe use of assets of a steel undertaking.
- Citation: 2025 c. 13
- Introduced by: Jonathan Reynolds, Secretary of State for Business and Trade (Commons); Baroness Jones of Whitchurch, Parliamentary Under-Secretary of State for Legislation (Lords)
- Territorial extent: England and Wales (Note: Section 10(1).) (Note: Although the act extends to England and Wales, the powers themselves only apply to England.)

Dates
- Royal assent: 12 April 2025
- Commencement: 12 April 2025 (Note: Section 10(2).)

Status: Current legislation

History of passage through Parliament

Text of statute as originally enacted

Revised text of statute as amended

The Steel Industry (Special Measures) Act 2025 (c. 13) is an act of the Parliament of the United Kingdom. It gives the Secretary of State for Business and Trade the power to direct the operations of steel manufacturers in order to prevent them ceasing to use certain assets, when it is in the public interest for the use of those assets to continue.

The act was a direct response to the refusal of Jingye Group, owner of British Steel, to continue to purchase the raw materials necessary for the operation of the two blast furnaces at Scunthorpe Steelworks, after it announced it was considering closing the facility.

It is very difficult to shut down blast furnaces without rendering them permanently unusable, and allowing the Scunthorpe blast furnaces—the only two remaining in the country—to run out of raw materials would have seen the end of primary steel production in the United Kingdom. The further threat of full closure of the plant puts at least 2,700 jobs at risk. The act allows the Secretary of State to keep it running while a long-term solution, possibly nationalisation, is decided.

The bill was passed and received royal assent in a single day on 12 April 2025, after Parliament was recalled from Easter break and convened in a rare Saturday sitting.

== Background ==
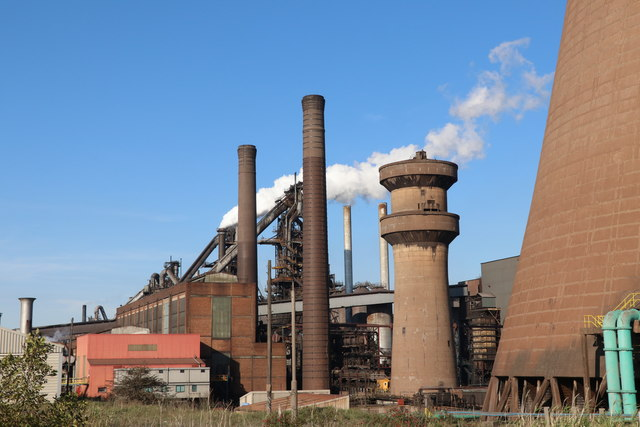
The blast furnances at Scunthorpe Steelworks were an important factor in the introduction of the legislation.

British Steel was founded in 2016 after Tata Steel sold its loss-making long products section to Greybull Capital for a nominal fee of £1.

British Steel went into insolvency in 2019 after rescue talks with the UK government failed to agree on emergency funding. It was transferred to the Official Receiver because the company and its shareholders did not provide the funds to pay for administration. It was bought in 2020 for £70 million by Chinese company Jingye Group, who agreed to invest £1.2 billion into the business. Jingye was the only bidder.

In March 2025, Jingye Group announced that it planned to close the Scunthorpe Steelworks, which it said were losing £700,000 a day. This would leave the UK as the only G7 country unable to make steel domestically from scratch. The UK government entered into talks with Jingye to keep the blast furnaces working. After blast furnaces have stopped, it is difficult and expensive to restart them. The Guardian reported on 9 April that talks had ended without a deal and that there was uncertainty as to whether the company would pay for coking coal or iron pellets, materials necessary to keep the steelworks viable.

== Provisions ==
The act allows the Secretary of State to intervene in the operations of steel manufacturers if their assets are at risk of closure, temporary or otherwise. The powers can only be used if the Secretary of State considers the continued operation of the assets to be in the public interest. Any directions about the use of assets made under the legislation can only be made in order to ensure their "continued and safe use".

The act allows the Secretary of State to take control of the manufacturer's assets if they were failing to follow the government's directions. Any costs incurred by the government while taking control of the assets would be recoverable from the manufacturer.

The act makes it a criminal offence to fail to comply with directions made by the Secretary of State under the legislation, punishable by up to two years in prison. It also allows the government to seek a High Court injunction to force continued operation of the assets.

The draft text of the bill was published shortly before the debate began. It did not include a sunset clause or clauses providing for post-legislative scrutiny, with the government providing no reasoning for this in their explanatory notes which accompanied the bill.

== Passage through Parliament ==
Parliament was on Easter recess from 8 to 22 April. On 11 April, it was announced that the House of Commons had been recalled for the next day, 12 April, at 11 am. The House of Lords was also recalled for 12 April, sitting from noon. Saturday sittings of the UK Parliament are unusual: the last such sittings were after the death of Elizabeth II in 2022; to debate the withdrawal from the European Union in 2019; and after the invasion of the Falkland Islands in 1982. It was the first recall of parliament while in recess since August 2021 when it was recalled for a debate on the withdrawal of U.S. troops from Afghanistan, and the first recall from recess to sit on a Saturday since the 1982 sitting.

The government had asked for the legislation to be "fast-tracked" due to the urgency needed to prevent the closure of steel production infrastructure. All stages of the bill were scheduled for 12 April, including a Committee of the Whole House, and the bill was the only item on the order paper. The House of Commons was not planned to be adjourned until the Speaker reported royal assent had been received to the bill.

=== House of Commons ===
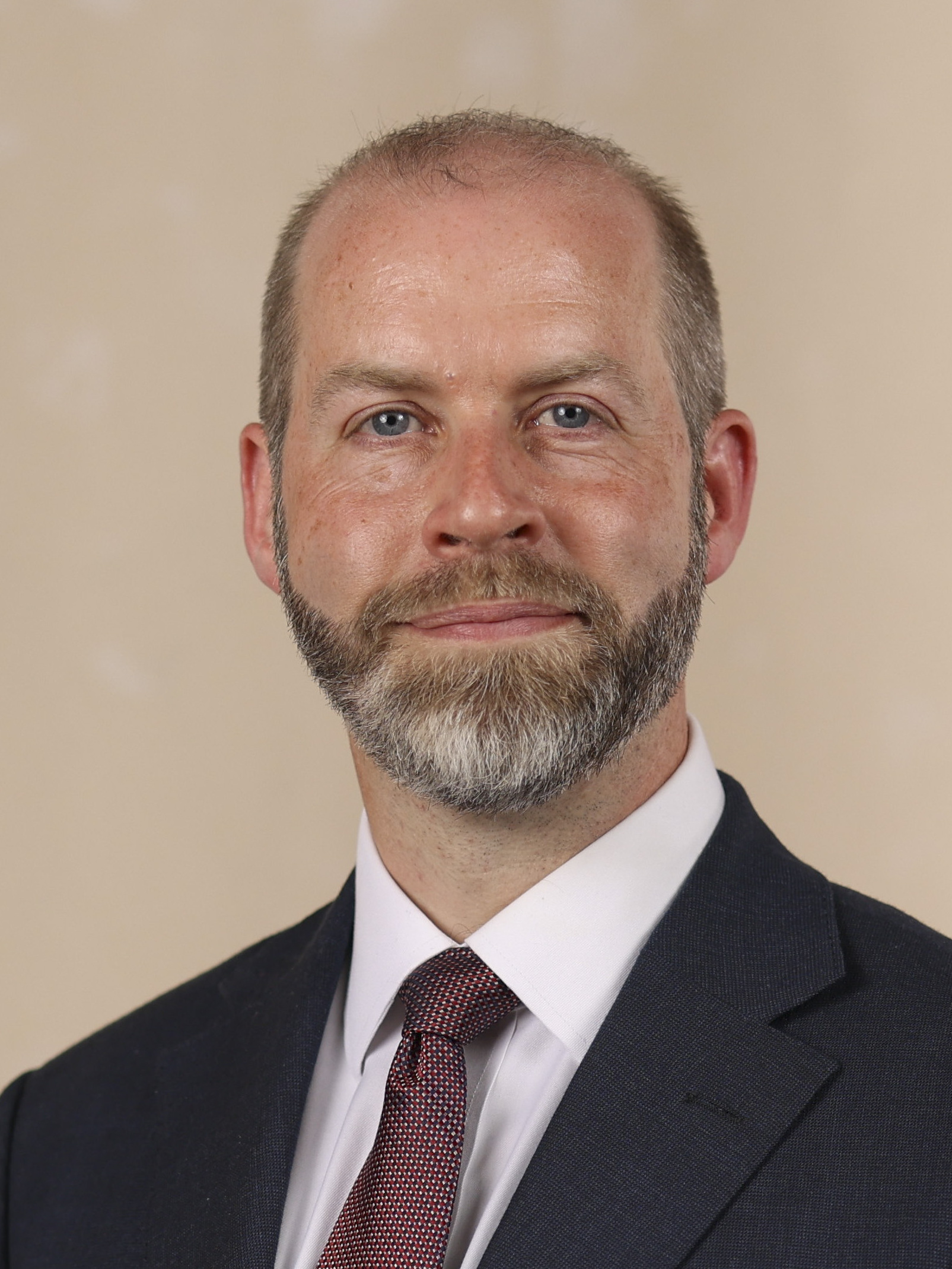
Jonathan Reynolds, the minister responsible for introducing the legislation to the House of Commons

The House of Commons convened at 11:00 a.m. At 11:04 a.m., Lucy Powell, the Leader of the House of Commons, proposed the order of business which included special provisions applying to the day's debate. (Note: These provisions included setting the debate to conclude at 2:00 p.m., allowing any member of the Panel of Chairs to take the chair as deputy speaker on the request of the Speaker, and the timing of the proceedings of different legislative stages.)

The second reading of the bill began at 11:10 a.m., being presented by Jonathan Reynolds, the Secretary of State for Business and Trade. Speeches from backbenchers were heard from 1:19 p.m. to 1:41 p.m. Frontbenchers Harriett Baldwin and Sarah Jones then spoke until 2:00 p.m., when the second reading finished. A Committee of the Whole House considered the bill; eight amendments were tabled, but there was no time available to debate them. The clauses of the draft bill were accepted with no amendments. The bill quickly passed its third reading, and the sitting was suspended at 2:04 p.m.

==== Commons amendments ====
Eight amendments to the bill were tabled in the House of Commons:

- Three amendments which expanded the bill's scope beyond England, two proposed by the Scottish National Party and one by Plaid Cymru;
- Three amendments which introduced a sunset clause on the bill's powers, two proposed by the Conservative Party and one by the Liberal Democrats;
- One amendment to include a clause requiring the Secretary of State to report to parliament within two months on the future of any steel manufacturer in whose operations the government had intervened, proposed by the Liberal Democrats;
- One amendment to include a clause requiring the Secretary of State to take actions "in a manner consistent with subsequent immediate nationalisation", proposed by Reform UK.

=== House of Lords ===
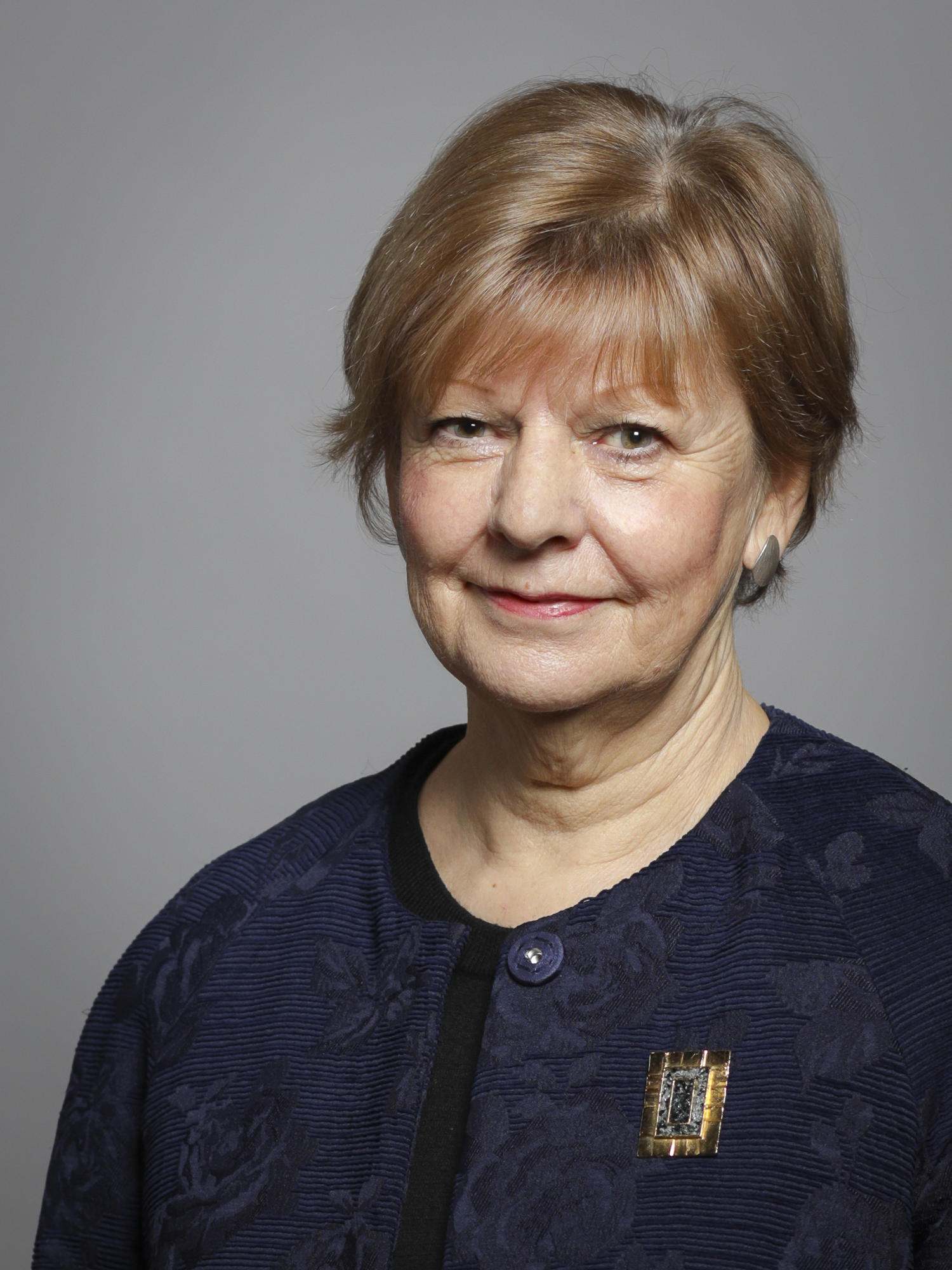
Baroness Jones of Whitchurch, the minister responsible for introducing the legislation to the House of Lords

The House of Lords convened at noon with prayers led by the Bishop of Lincoln, holding a take-note debate on the issue while the bill moved through the House of Commons. The take-note debate began at 12:08 p.m. and the first reading occurred at 2:41 p.m. The sitting was then suspended for 15 minutes so that the bill could be printed, before resuming for the second reading at 2:57 p.m. and being committed to a Committee of the Whole House. The sitting was suspended again for an hour at 2:59 p.m. to allow amendments to be tabled.

Sitting resumed as a Committee of the Whole House at 4:45 p.m. with the first clause of the bill being agreed to and Lord Hunt's amendment to the second clause being moved. After replying to the proposed amendments to the bill, Baroness Jones of Whitchurch asked that they be withdrawn. Lord Hunt's amendment was subsequently withdrawn and the rest of the amendments were not moved, meaning the bill was reported out of committee without amendment. At 5:13 p.m., the bill had its third reading and passed, with the sitting suspended at 5:17 p.m. The act was given royal assent at 6:00 p.m. and the House of Lords was adjourned at 6:01 p.m.

==== Lords amendments ====
Five amendments to the bill were tabled in the House of Lords:

- Two amendments by Lord Hunt of Wirral and Lord Davies of Gower to introduce a sunset clause.
- One amendment by Baroness Freeman of Steventon to clarify that the Secretary of State does not need to be physically on the premises of a manufacturer in order to exercise the bill's powers.
- One amendment by Baroness Coffey to introduce reporting requirements on the Secretary of State and provide for post-legislative scrutiny. Coffey said that her amendment was "literally lifted, with a bit of adjusting" from the Coronavirus Act 2020, another piece of emergency legislation.
- One amendment by Lord Fox and Baroness Brinton to provide for another debate on the bill's powers within six months.

== Responses ==
Prime Minister Keir Starmer visited steelworkers in Lincolnshire after the legislation had passed the House of Commons, saying that the government was "acting to protect the jobs of thousands of workers, and all options are on the table to secure the future of the industry." Business secretary Jonathan Reynolds said that the government "could not, will not and never will stand idly by while heat seeps from the UK's remaining blast furnaces without any planning, any due process or any respect for the consequences."

Leader of the Opposition Kemi Badenoch said that the government should have made a deal with the Jingye Group to prevent the Scunthorpe works from closing; she said Starmer had "let the unions dictate" the government's actions. The shadow business secretary Andrew Griffith said that the government was seeking a "blank cheque" and that the legislation would mean that "the chancellor will be standing behind the payroll" of British Steel.

Several politicians from Wales argued that the legislation showed the government's double standards since it had not stepped in to save steel manufacturing at Port Talbot Steelworks. Plaid Cymru MP Liz Saville-Roberts said that while "Scunthorpe gets security, Port Talbot gets a pittance" and Liberal Democrat MP David Chadwick noted that "the simple fact is ... the government did not recall parliament for Port Talbot." Welsh Conservatives leader Darren Millar called for the Senedd to be recalled from Easter recess to discuss the legislation.

== Impact ==
BBC News reported on 11 April that the government had told the company's UK management to keep the plant operational, with the bill allowing any employees who are sacked to be reinstated by the government. The Times reported that on the morning of 12 April, steelworkers prevented Jingye executives from accessing "critical parts" of the Scunthorpe site, fearing they would sabotage the works. Humberside Police were called, but no arrests were made and the executives left. Sky News reported at 4:33 p.m. that government officials from the Department for Business and Trade had arrived at the Scunthorpe site in preparation to take over the plant's management. On October 14, 2025, the BBC reported that British Steel's Scunthorpe plant was the last remaining site in the UK producing virgin steel.

== See also ==
- Iron and Steel Act 1949 - previous UK legislation related to the steel industry.
