= Public Sector Fraud Authority =

Public body of the UK government

The Public Sector Fraud Authority is a British government organization which works to combat fraud. It is part of the Cabinet Office and HM Treasury. It is listed by the government as a "high-profile group".

As of 2026, it had over 100 staff. In 2025, it was granted new powers under the Public Authorities (Fraud, Error and Recovery) Act 2025.
