= Product Regulation and Metrology Act 2025 =

Act of the Parliament of the United Kingdom

Product Regulation and Metrology Act 2025 (Note: Section 16.)
- Act of Parliament
- Parliament of the United Kingdom
- Long title: An Act to make provision about the marketing or use of products in the United Kingdom; about units of measurement and the quantities in which goods are marketed in the United Kingdom; and for connected purposes.
- Citation: 2025 c. 20
- Introduced by: Jonathan Reynolds (Commons); Lord Leong (Lords)
- Territorial extent: England and Wales; Scotland; Northern Ireland; (Note: Section 14.)

Dates
- Royal assent: 21 July 2025
- Commencement: Sections 11(1) and 11(3) as the Secretary of State appoints. The rest of the act came into force on the day of royal assent. (Note: Section 15.)
Other legislation
| Amends | Consumer Protection Act 1987; Weights and Measures Act 1985; Gun Barrel Proof Acts 1868 to 1978; Government of Wales Act 2006 |

Status: Current legislation

History of passage through Parliament

Records of Parliamentary debate relating to the statute from Hansard

Text of statute as originally enacted

Revised text of statute as amended

The Product Regulation and Metrology Act 2025 (c. 20) is an act of the Parliament of the United Kingdom which regulates units of measurement and quantities of goods marketed.

Among various measures, the act gives regulators the power to investigate compliance measures and allows the secretary of state, by regulations, to set "product requirements" for the marketing or use of products in the UK, which corresponds to, or is similar to a provision of "relevant EU law" for the purpose of reducing or mitigating the environmental impact of products. The UK government says that the act will help to "address current and future challenges", "identify and regulate new and emerging business models in the supply chain" and "tackle non-compliance with product safety and metrology regulations".

Joël Reland, a senior researcher at the thinktank UK in a Changing Europe stated that it "would give UK ministers the power to unilaterally align with European Union regulations related to the environmental impact of products" even though the UK has left the EU. The Scottish Parliament Information Centre confirmed this by citing further research, and pointed out that "the potential for divergence between Scots law and EU law increases over time". The BBC reported that the bill "could help limit the impact of the Irish Sea border between Northern Ireland and the rest of the UK", quoting UK Government notes on the bill: "This Bill gives the Government specific powers to make changes to legislation in Great Britain to manage divergence and take a UK-wide approach", as EU rules (even new ones) continue to apply to Northern Ireland after Brexit under the Northern Ireland Protocol and the Windsor Framework.

== Reception ==
The Conservative peer, David Frost, described legislation as a means to "re-import" EU law concepts.
