= Great British Grid =

Proposed British government-backed organization

Great British Grid (GB Grid, GBG) is a proposed publicly owned entity backed by the British government that will seek to bring electrical energy distribution under greater public control and ownership. It will have access to a £4 billion investment fund that has been allocated to Great British Energy. It was announced by Prime Minister Andy Burnham in a speech at the 2026 Labour Party Conference in Liverpool.

According to the government, GB Grid is intended to supplement commercial bids for future transmission network requirements, and to "complement, rather than replace, the existing institutions responsible for Britain’s energy system and the role of existing network operators remains unchanged".

== See also ==
- Electricity in Great Britain
