= Great British Energy =

British governmental investment body

Great British Energy Group Ltd.
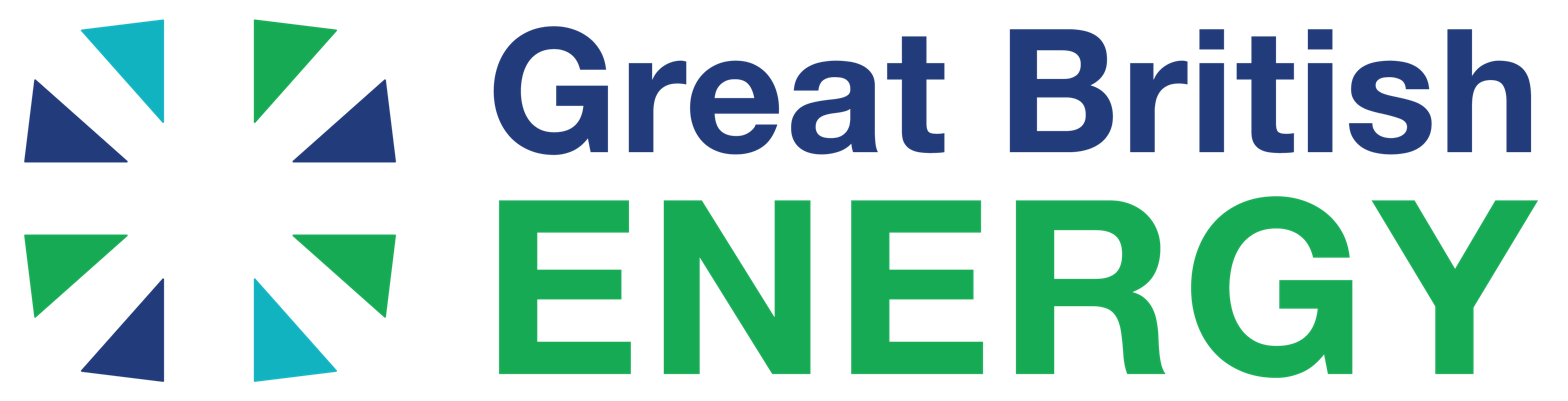
- Logo of Great British Energy

Agency overview
- Formed: 15 May 2025
- Jurisdiction: United Kingdom
- Headquarters: Aberdeen, Scotland, UK
- Minister responsible: Miatta Fahnbulleh, Secretary of State for Energy Security and Net Zero
- Agency executives: Jürgen Maier, Chair; Dan McGrail, Chief Executive
- Parent department: Department for Energy Security and Net Zero
- Key document: Great British Energy Act 2025
- Website: www.gbe.gov.uk

Great British Energy (GB Energy, GBE) is a publicly owned energy investment company in the United Kingdom. It was established by the Great British Energy Act 2025, which received royal assent on 15 May 2025, and is sponsored by the Department for Energy Security and Net Zero. GBE invests in and co-develops clean energy and energy storage projects, and supports community energy and related supply chains. It is headquartered at Marischal Square in Aberdeen, Scotland.

According to government publications, GBE and Great British Energy – Nuclear are backed with up to £8.3 billion during the Parliament elected in 2024. Early activity has included a partnership with The Crown Estate on clean energy infrastructure.

== History ==
=== Origins ===
The proposal for a publicly owned energy company named Great British Energy was announced by Keir Starmer at the Labour Party conference in September 2022. It was later set out as a key policy in the party’s 2024 general election manifesto.

=== Establishment ===
The Great British Energy Act 2025 received royal assent on 15 May 2025. The Act established Great British Energy as a publicly owned energy investment company and provided for sponsorship by the Department for Energy Security and Net Zero.

Juergen Maier was appointed as Chair.

=== Early milestones ===
In July 2024 the government and The Crown Estate announced a partnership intended to support the delivery of clean energy infrastructure and to help attract private investment. On the same day the Secretary of State confirmed the appointment of Jürgen Maier as start-up chair, recorded in a departmental notice and a Parliamentary written answer. In September 2024 the government announced that Great British Energy would be headquartered in Aberdeen, Scotland. The first Statement of Strategic Priorities required by the 2025 act was published on 16 September 2025.

== Legal foundation ==
The Great British Energy Act 2025 established Great British Energy as a publicly owned energy investment company and set the framework for its operation and oversight. The act provides that the company is not an agent or servant of the Crown and does not have Crown immunities. It sets out the company’s objects, including clean-energy production, distribution, storage and supply, measures to reduce greenhouse-gas emissions from fossil-fuel energy, support for energy efficiency and energy security, and supply-chain due-diligence measures.

The act enables the Secretary of State to provide financial assistance to the company. Assistance may take forms such as grants, loans, guarantees, equity and contracts, subject to applicable public-finance and subsidy-control rules. The Secretary of State must publish a Statement of Strategic Priorities for Great British Energy, and the company must publish strategic plans that respond to that statement. The Act also makes provision for ministerial directions, the laying of annual accounts before Parliament and periodic independent reviews of the company’s effectiveness. It extends across the United Kingdom and commenced on royal assent on 15 May 2025.

== Mandate and activities ==
Great British Energy’s mandate is to invest in and co-develop projects that support the United Kingdom’s transition to clean and stored power, alongside work on local and community energy and related supply chains. Official material describes a public investor and developer role that seeks to co-invest with the private sector and deliver value for money.

=== Investment approach ===
GBE focuses on commercially viable projects where public capital can help unlock delivery or scale. The company operates within ministerial priorities and publishes strategic plans that respond to those priorities. Activity is intended to complement existing market frameworks and to work with devolved governments and public bodies where relevant.

=== Technology focus ===
The first published statement of strategic priorities asks GBE to look across the clean energy technology spectrum, including renewables, energy storage and other low-carbon technologies. It highlights collaboration with partners across the United Kingdom and alignment with system needs and regional opportunities.

=== Renewables ===
GBE's remit includes partnering on renewable generation such as offshore wind, onshore wind, solar photovoltaic projects and, where appropriate, marine energy. Work can include co-development, co-investment and support for supply-chain capacity and skills. Where projects relate to the seabed, developers obtain leases from the relevant Crown body, and GBE's partnership with The Crown Estate forms part of this delivery context.

=== Energy storage ===
The statement of strategic priorities includes storage to enable a higher share of variable renewable generation and to improve system flexibility. Current policy frameworks relevant to storage include a long-duration electricity storage investment support scheme administered by Ofgem, under which large battery projects entered a further phase in 2025. GBE operates alongside such schemes when considering potential co-investment in storage assets.

=== Nuclear ===
Great British Energy – Nuclear is an executive non-departmental public body sponsored by the Department for Energy Security and Net Zero. It supports the civil nuclear programme, including small modular reactors. On 10 June 2025 the government announced Rolls-Royce SMR as the preferred bidder to partner with Great British Energy – Nuclear to develop the first small modular reactors in the United Kingdom, subject to approvals and contracts.

=== Partnerships and early projects ===
In July 2024 the government announced a partnership between GBE and The Crown Estate to support the accelerated delivery of clean-energy infrastructure, with the announcement stating the partnership had the potential to leverage private investment. In March 2025 the government described GBE's first major project as a programme to install rooftop solar on around 200 schools and around 200 NHS sites, followed by updates on delivery and extensions to additional public-estate sites. GBE also announced a £10 million partnership offer to mayoral authorities to support local clean-power projects.

== Funding and finance ==
According to government publications, Great British Energy and Great British Energy – Nuclear are backed with up to £8.3 billion during the Parliament elected in 2024. The Great British Energy Act 2025 enables the Secretary of State to provide financial assistance to the company. Assistance may take forms such as grants, loans, guarantees, equity and contracts, subject to applicable public-finance frameworks.

Great British Energy operates alongside existing market support schemes. The government describes Contracts for Difference as its main mechanism for supporting low-carbon electricity generation. The Low Carbon Contracts Company acts as the statutory counterparty to CfD agreements and manages awarded contracts. The National Energy System Operator performs the delivery-body role for CfD allocation rounds and provides application guidance and notices.

Other revenue-support models also sit alongside GBE's investment role. The government has designated the Low Carbon Contracts Company as counterparty for revenue-support contracts under the Hydrogen Production Business Model. In parallel, public-finance partners such as the National Wealth Fund have announced financing for network upgrades, which forms part of the wider delivery context for new generation and storage.

Public authorities must comply with the United Kingdom’s subsidy-control regime and with the reformed public-procurement rules when awarding support or entering contracts. Official guidance explains the requirements of the Subsidy Control Act 2022 and the implementation of the Procurement Act 2023.

== Governance and oversight ==
=== Corporate governance ===
Great British Energy is sponsored by the Department for Energy Security and Net Zero and operates at arm's length from central government. The Great British Energy Act 2025 provides that the company is not an agent or servant of the Crown and does not have Crown immunities. The Secretary of State appointed Jürgen Maier as start-up chair in July 2024, recorded in a departmental notice and a Parliamentary written answer. GBE's leadership pages state that a start-up board was appointed in January 2025 and that three non-executive board members joined in September 2025. The founding statement and the statement of strategic priorities note that a framework document will set out roles, responsibilities and the sponsorship relationship with DESNZ, to be agreed and published.

=== Accountability ===
The 2025 act provides for ministerial directions to the company, for annual accounts to be laid before Parliament, and for periodic independent reviews of GBE's effectiveness. UK government guidance explains that ministerial directions are normally published, and links to published directions across departments. The act also requires a published statement of strategic priorities, to which the company must respond in its strategic plan.

=== Devolution and consenting ===
The Act extends across the United Kingdom. In practice, energy policy is generally reserved to UK ministers while planning and consenting for electricity generation and associated works are devolved in Scotland and Wales, and sit with the Northern Ireland institutions. Consenting thresholds and routes differ by jurisdiction. In Scotland, generating stations over 50 MW require consent from Scottish ministers under section 36 of the Electricity Act 1989 via the Energy Consents Unit. In Wales, projects of 10–350 MW are considered Developments of National Significance and determined by Welsh ministers through Planning and Environment Decisions Wales. For England and Wales, national infrastructure guidance covers larger schemes above 50 MW onshore and 100 MW offshore. During February 2025, the Senedd, the Scottish Parliament and the Northern Ireland Assembly each agreed a legislative consent motion in relation to the Bill that became the Great British Energy Act 2025.

== Delivery framework ==
The development of new generation and storage typically proceeds through two enabling steps. Where projects use the seabed they require a lease from the relevant Crown body. All grid-connected projects then progress through the connections process run by the system operator and the transmission owners, alongside the statutory planning and consenting routes described elsewhere in this article.

=== Seabed leasing ===
Offshore projects in waters around England, Wales and Northern Ireland obtain rights from The Crown Estate, which runs competitive leasing rounds and issues survey and investigation licences that can precede a full lease. Current initiatives include the Crown Estate’s Celtic Sea programme and associated Round 5 activities aimed at enabling new offshore wind capacity. In Scotland, seabed rights are managed by Crown Estate Scotland, which led the ScotWind leasing round using option agreements that convert to full leases following statutory consents and financing.

Both Crown bodies typically grant an option agreement before a full lease. The option is awarded after plan-level environmental assessment and Habitats Regulations assessment for the leasing round, and it allows pre-consent activities such as surveys. The full lease is usually granted after statutory consents are obtained and financing is in place. The Crown Estate publishes plan-level assessments for leasing rounds, and Crown Estate Scotland publishes sectoral marine plan assessments and plan-level HRA for ScotWind.

=== Connections and system coordination ===
The National Energy System Operator coordinates connections to the national electricity transmission system and works with licensed transmission owners and distribution network operators to progress applications. In 2025 the system operator implemented connections reform designed to prioritise projects that are ready to progress and to improve queue management, following approvals by the regulator Ofgem. Under the milestones-based queue management process, connection queue positions are determined and maintained using evidence-based project milestones. Projects that do not meet milestones may move position or exit the queue under the published guidance and Ofgem decisions. In early 2025 the operator announced a short pause on new connection applications while it focused on delivering the reforms.

See Governance and oversight for planning and consenting thresholds and decision routes that apply alongside leasing and connections.

== Reception and debate ==
Commentators have identified potential benefits and risks as Great British Energy has been established. The Institute for Government argued that a public investor could help crowd in private capital and accelerate clean power deployment if the mandate is focused and governance is clear. The House of Commons Library briefing outlines expected advantages and constraints of the model, including interactions with existing support schemes and delivery dependencies. The IPPR proposed implementation options and warned that unclear objectives could dilute impact.

Criticism has centred on affordability, scale and prioritisation. In June 2025, several outlets reported that part of the headline allocation would support nuclear activity through Great British Energy – Nuclear. This prompted debate about the balance of funding across technologies and the timing of delivery benefits. Energy company leaders told the press and MPs that non-commodity costs, including network and system charges, could keep bills high even if wholesale prices fall, which complicates near term bill reduction claims. Government statements in the same coverage argue that expanding domestic clean energy reduces exposure to gas price volatility and supports long term bill stability.

Parliamentary scrutiny has included questions about value for money, due diligence and modern slavery safeguards in supply chains, and the pace of delivery. The House of Lords Library briefing summarised the main arguments raised during passage. Debates recorded in Hansard also reflect differing views among parties on the scope of ministerial powers and the role of public investment alongside the private sector.

Stakeholder responses have been mixed. Energy UK welcomed the legislation and said a public investor could help attract private capital and support the supply chain. Independent outlets such as Carbon Brief have noted the scale of investment required and the importance of planning and grid reforms for delivery.

== See also ==
- Electricity Act 1989
- Energy policy of the United Kingdom
- Great British Grid
- National Energy System Operator
- Nationally significant infrastructure project
- Office of Gas and Electricity Markets
- Renewable energy in the United Kingdom
