= Stoke Newington Central (ward) =

- Former electoral ward for the Hackney London Borough Council
- Stoke Newington Central ward boundaries
- Borough: Hackney
- County: Greater London
- Population: 12,445 (2011)
- Electorate: 8,760 (2010)

Former electoral ward
- Created: 2002
- Abolished: 2014
- Councillors: 3
- Replaced by: Shacklewell, Stoke Newington
- ONS code: 00AMGS
- GSS code: E05000247

Stoke Newington Central was a ward in the London Borough of Hackney. It corresponded roughly to Stoke Newington in London, UK and formed part of the Hackney North and Stoke Newington constituency of Diane Abbott MP.

The ward returned three councillors to the borough council, with elections every four years. At the election on 6 May 2010 Rita Krishna, Susan Fajana-Thomas and Louisa Thompson all Labour Party candidates, were returned. Turnout was 65%; and 5,674 votes were cast.

In 2001, Stoke Newington Central ward had a total population of 10,143. This compares with the average ward population within the borough of 10,674. At the 2011 Census the population was 12,445.

== Hackney council elections ==
=== 2010 election ===
2010 Hackney London Borough Council election: Stoke Newington Central
Party	Candidate	Votes	%	±%
Labour	Susan Fajana-Thomas	2,471	43.5	
Labour	Louisa Thomson	2,367	41.7	
Labour	Rita Krishna	2,362	41.6	
Green	Anna Hughes	1,649	29.1	
Green	Matthew Hanley	1,641	28.9	
Green	Joe Hulm	1,262	22.2	
Liberal Democrats	John Hodgson	1,077	19.0	
Liberal Democrats	Carl Nicholas	775	13.7	
Liberal Democrats	Simon Scott-Daniels	735	13.0	
Conservative	Richie Benson	379	6.7	
Conservative	Hannah Devoy	358	6.3	
Conservative	Zeynep Karayilan	68	1.2	
Majority		713	12.6	
Turnout		5,674	65	
Labour hold		Swing		

=== 2009 by-election ===
2009 Stoke Newington Central by-election
Party	Candidate	Votes	%	±%
Labour	Louisa Thomson	1162	47.8	
Green	Matthew Hanley	783	32.2	
Liberal Democrats	Karelia Scott	297	12.2	
Conservative	Patricia Napier	169	7.0	
Direct Democracy	Nusret Sen	20	0.8	
Majority		379	15.6	
Turnout		2,431	30	
Labour hold		Swing		

=== 2006 election ===
2006 Hackney London Borough Council election: Stoke Newington Central
Party	Candidate	Votes	%	±%
Labour	James Carswell	1,207	45.8	
Labour	Rita Krishna	1,183	44.9	
Labour	Muttalip Unluer	913	34.6	
Green	Jenny Lopez	769	29.2	
Green	Robert Lindsay	708	26.9	
Green	Gordon Hodgson	676	25.6	
Liberal Democrats	Victoria Lubbock	448	17.0	
Liberal Democrats	Steven Allen	411	15.6	
Liberal Democrats	Timothy Nichols	371	14.1	
Conservative	Joyce Palmer	239	9.1	
Conservative	Lillian Fazzani	223	8.5	
Conservative	Comfort Tawiah	176	6.7	
Majority		144	5.5	
Turnout		2,636	37	
Labour hold		Swing		

=== 2002 election ===
2002 Hackney London Borough Council election: Stoke Newington Central
Party	Candidate	Votes	%	±%
Labour	Rita Krishna	1,140	47.1	
Labour	James Carswell	1,067	44.1	
Labour	Muttalip Unluer	968	40.0	
Green	Mark Douglas	579	23.9	
Green	Daniel Bates	492	19.1	
Green	Brenda Puech	491	20.3	
Liberal Democrats	Ronald Anderson	369	15.2	
Liberal Democrats	Wendy Monro	329	13.6	
Liberal Democrats	Simon Kemp	305	12.6	
Socialist Alliance	Anne McShane	170	7.0	
Conservative	Medlin Lewis-Spencer	158	6.5	
Conservative	James Spencer	147	6.1	
CPA	Bianca McIntosh	69	2.9	
Turnout		2,420	35.0	
Labour hold		Swing		
