= Jonathan Reynolds =

British politician (born 1980)

The Right Honourable Jonathan Reynolds MP
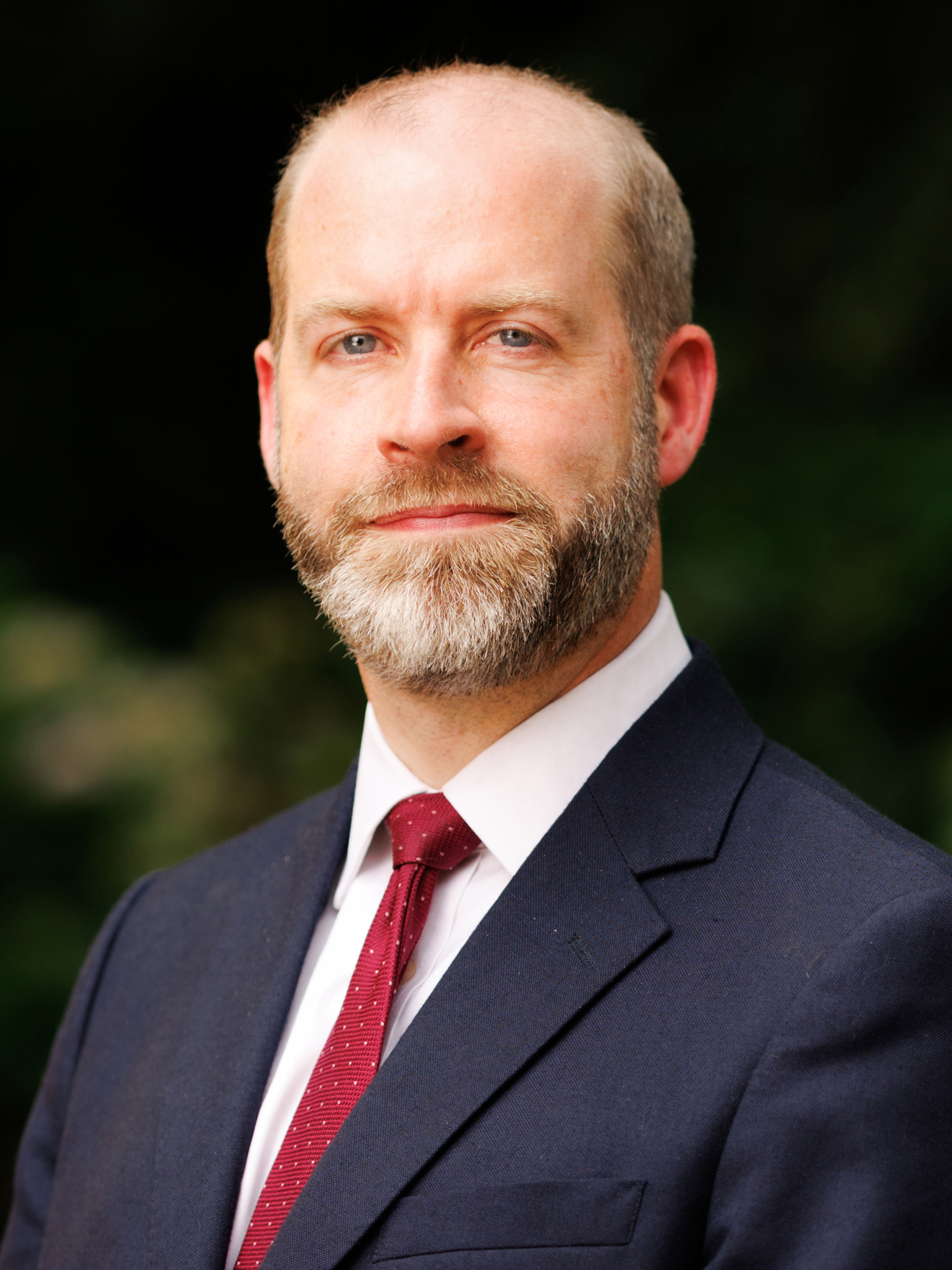
- Official portrait, 2026

Secretary of State for Business, Innovation, Science and Trade (Note: Secretary of State for Business and Trade from 2024 to 2025. He assumed responsibilities of Science and Innovation from Liz Kendall in 2026.) President of the Board of Trade
- Incumbent
- Assumed office 20 July 2026
- Prime Minister: Andy Burnham
- Preceded by: Peter Kyle
- In office 5 July 2024 – 5 September 2025
- Prime Minister: Keir Starmer
- Preceded by: Kemi Badenoch
- Succeeded by: Peter Kyle
Shadow portfolios
Shadow Secretary of State for Business and Trade (Note: As Shadow Secretary of State for Business and Industrial Strategy until 4 September 2023)
In office 29 November 2021 – 5 July 2024
Leader	Keir Starmer
Preceded by	Ed Miliband (Note: As Shadow Secretary of State for Business, Energy and Industrial Strategy.)
Succeeded by	Kevin Hollinrake
Shadow Secretary of State for Work and Pensions
In office 6 April 2020 – 29 November 2021
Leader	Keir Starmer
Preceded by	Margaret Greenwood
Succeeded by	Jonathan Ashworth
Shadow Economic Secretary to the Treasury
In office 8 October 2016 – 6 April 2020
Leader	Jeremy Corbyn
Preceded by	Richard Burgon
Succeeded by	Pat McFadden
Shadow Minister for Rail
In office 14 September 2015 – 6 January 2016
Leader	Jeremy Corbyn
Preceded by	Lilian Greenwood
Succeeded by	Andy McDonald
Shadow Minister for Energy and Climate Change
In office 7 October 2013 – 18 September 2015
Leader	Ed Miliband
Preceded by	Luciana Berger
Succeeded by	Alan Whitehead

Government Chief Whip in the House of Commons Parliamentary Secretary to the Treasury
- In office 5 September 2025 – 20 July 2026
- Prime Minister: Keir Starmer
- Preceded by: Alan Campbell
- Succeeded by: Anneliese Midgley

Member of Parliament for Stalybridge and Hyde
- Incumbent
- Assumed office 6 May 2010
- Preceded by: James Purnell
- Majority: 8,539 (22.9%)

Member of Tameside Metropolitan Borough Council for Longdendale
- In office 4 May 2007 – 5 May 2011
- Preceded by: Peter Bibby
- Succeeded by: Gillian Peet

Personal details
- Born: Jonathan Neil Reynolds; 28 August 1980 (age 46) Houghton-le-Spring, Tyne and Wear, England
- Party: Labour Co-op
- Spouse: Claire Reynolds (m. 2008)
- Children: 4
- Education: University of Manchester (BA); BPP University (GDL, LPC)
- Website: Official website
- Jonathan Reynolds's voice Reynolds on the March 2017 United Kingdom budget Recorded 14 March 2017

Jonathan Neil Reynolds (born 28 August 1980) is a British politician who has served as Secretary of State for Business, Innovation, Science and Trade and President of the Board of Trade since 2026, having previously held the positions from 2024 to 2025. A member of the Labour and Co-operative parties, he has been the Member of Parliament (MP) for Stalybridge and Hyde since 2010.

Born in Houghton-le-Spring, Reynolds attended Houghton Kepier Comprehensive School and Sunderland City College. He studied politics at University of Manchester and then attended BPP Law School. He worked as a trainee solicitor for Addleshaw Goddard though never completed his solicitor training. Reynolds was on Labour's National Executive Committee from 2003 to 2005 and a political assistant for four years to James Purnell, and served on Tameside Council from 2007 to 2011. Reynolds was elected as MP for Stalybridge and Hyde at the 2010 general election, and subsequently joined the frontbench under Ed Miliband.

Reynolds was Parliamentary Private Secretary (PPS) to Miliband and shadow energy minister from 2013 to 2015. Following Jeremy Corbyn's election as party leader in September 2015, Reynolds became a shadow transport minister before returning to the backbenches in January 2016. He returned to the frontbench in October of the same year, serving until 2020. Under Keir Starmer, Reynolds was promoted to the shadow cabinet as shadow work and pensions secretary in 2020. In a 2021 shadow cabinet reshuffle, he was appointed shadow business secretary.

Following Labour's victory in the 2024 general election, Reynolds was appointed to government as Secretary of State for Business and Trade and President of the Board of Trade by Starmer in his ministry. In the 2025 cabinet reshuffle, he was appointed Chief Whip and Parliamentary Secretary to the Treasury. After Andy Burnham became Prime Minister in 2026, Reynolds returned to his previous role as business secretary, with additional responsibilities of science and innovation.

== Early life and career ==
Jonathan Reynolds was born on 28 August 1980 in Houghton-le-Spring in Tyne and Wear to Keith and Judith Reynolds. He was educated at Houghton Kepier Comprehensive School and Sunderland City College. He moved to Manchester in 1998, studying politics and modern history at the University of Manchester, and then studying at BPP Law School. After leaving university Reynolds worked as a trainee solicitor in the Manchester branch of the law firm Addleshaw Goddard, though never completed his solicitor training (despite his claims to the contrary).

Before becoming an MP, Reynolds served on Labour's National Executive Committee from 2003 to 2005. In 2007, he was elected to Tameside Council as the councillor for the Longdendale ward.

Reynolds worked for four years as a political assistant for the Stalybridge and Hyde MP James Purnell and was selected to replace Purnell after a controversial selection process. Reynolds is a member of the Co-operative Party and Unite the Union.

== Parliamentary career ==
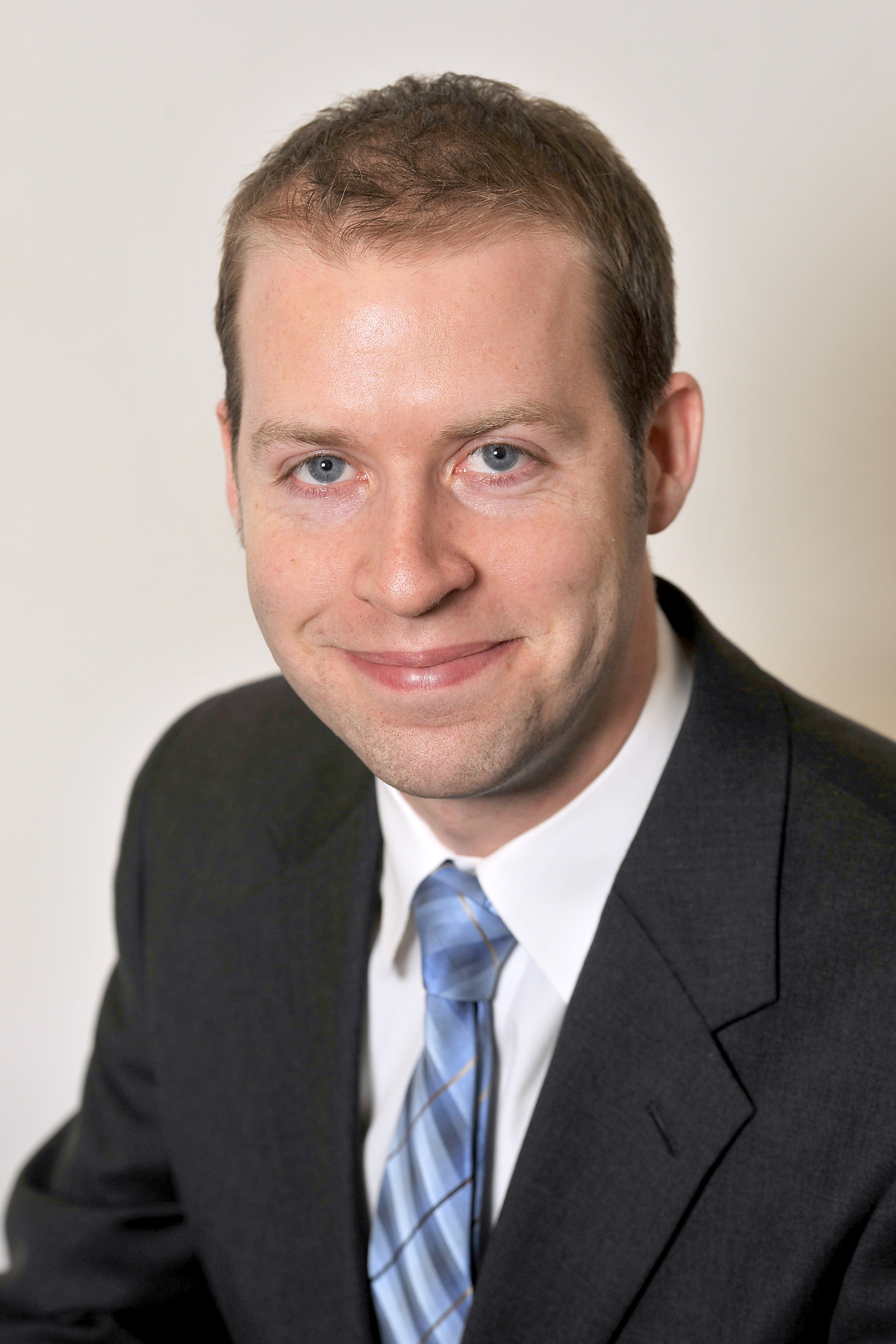
Reynolds in 2011

At the 2010 general election, Reynolds was elected as MP for Stalybridge and Hyde with 39.6% of the vote and a majority of 2,744. In 2011 Reynolds stood down as a councillor. Once elected as an MP he did not claim Councillor Allowances. In July 2013, Reynolds publicly called for the resignation of Tameside Hospital's Chief Executive, Christine Green.

During his campaign, Reynolds focused on local issues such as the redevelopment of town centres, particularly Stalybridge, the Mottram-Tintwistle Bypass, the need for more primary school places in Hyde, and improved rail links in his constituency. His commitment to addressing these local concerns resonated with voters and helped him secure the seat. He also supported improvements Northern Hub rail and also opposed policing cuts in his constituency.

=== Miliband shadow cabinet ===
Under Ed Miliband, Reynolds was appointed Shadow Justice and Constitutional Affairs Whip. He was later appointed Miliband's Parliamentary Private Secretary and Shadow Minister for Energy and Climate Change. As Shadow Energy Minister, he focused on fuel poverty, energy efficiency, and solar energy. At the 2015 general election, Reynolds was re-elected as MP for Stalybridge and Hyde with an increased vote share of 45% and an increased majority of 6,686.

=== Corbyn shadow cabinet ===
After Jeremy Corbyn was elected to the leadership of the Labour Party in September 2015, Reynolds was made a Shadow Minister for Transport with responsibility for rail. He resigned the position following Jeremy Corbyn's January 2016 reshuffle, saying he felt he could "best serve the party as a backbencher" and expressing his support for the sacked Pat McFadden. He supported Owen Smith in the 2016 Labour leadership election. Following the re-election of Jeremy Corbyn as leader of the Labour Party, he was re-appointed to the shadow front bench as Shadow City Minister.

In December 2015, Reynolds introduced a Private Member's Bill which would have changed UK general elections from first-past-the-post to the additional-member system. Reynolds was appointed a member of the BIS Select Committee in 2016. He questioned Mike Ashley during the committee's inquiry into working practices at Sports Direct. In June 2016, Reynolds argued the Labour Party had not developed a credible "alternative economic model". He has argued in favour of an industrial policy and reforms to UK equity markets.

In his time as Shadow City Minister Reynolds spoke in support of a Brexit deal which is favourable to financial services. City A.M. Editor Christian May described him in November 2016 as "popular in the Square Mile and at home in the brief". At the snap 2017 general election, Reynolds was again re-elected with an increased vote share of 57.2% and an increased majority of 8,084. Reynolds is Chair of Christians on the Left, and also a vice-chair of Labour Friends of Israel. Reynolds has identified as a Christian socialist.

At the 2019 general election, Reynolds was again re-elected, with a decreased vote share of 44.7% and a decreased majority of 2,946.

=== Starmer shadow cabinet ===
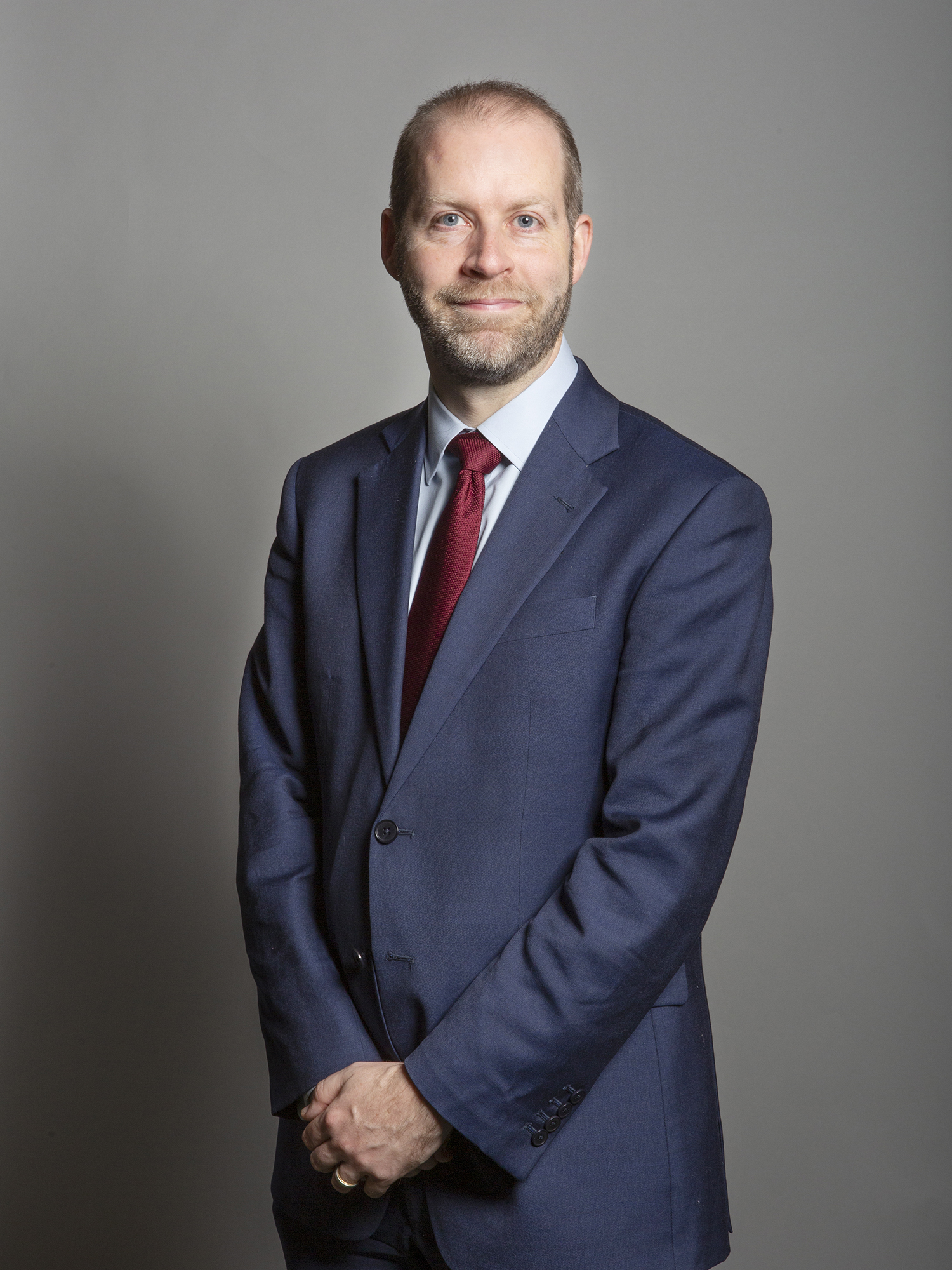
Official portrait, 2019

Following the 2020 Labour Party leadership election, Keir Starmer appointed Reynolds as the Shadow Secretary of State for Work and Pensions.

Reynolds addressed the failings of the Universal Credit system, which he argued did not adequately support vulnerable people while calling for reforming legacy benefits and improving the overall welfare system to ensure fair and dignified support for all recipients. He frequently called for an emergency budget to tackle the immediate economic impacts of the pandemic and focusing on the need for long-term planning in pensions and social security.

In September 2023, after a shadow cabinet reshuffle, he was appointed as Shadow Secretary of State for Business and Trade.

Reynolds advocated for a balanced approach to the UK-EU relationship since the Brexit referendum. He said that Labour would not seek to rejoin the EU's single market or customs union, focusing instead on achieving a more favourable trade deal with the EU without reopening Brexit debates. He also said that he believed that political stability and good-faith negotiations were crucial for enhancing the trading relationship with the EU, aiming for practical improvements such as mutual recognition of professional qualifications and easier inter-company transfers.

Reynolds also supported an industrial strategy inspired by Bidenomics, focusing on re-industrialising and decarbonising the economy through strategic investments and regulatory changes which aimed to align domestic industrial policy with foreign trade policy, ensuring that the economic benefits of green transitions would be felt by British workers.

Reynolds focused on revitalising the country's industrial strategy and addressing the economic challenges post-Brexit. Reynolds initiative was the launch of Labour's industrial strategy, which aimed to tackle issues such as supply chain disruptions and workforce skills shortages, with an emphasis on delivering clean power and reducing carbon dependency by 2030 and leveraging for the launch of a state-owned energy company. Reynolds was a staunch advocate for the Green Prosperity Plan, which aimed to create a million new jobs through green investment which would guarantee economic benefits by achieving net zero emissions, including reduced energy costs and new jobs.

Reynolds was vocal about the inadequacies of government policy regarding energy regulation and criticised the government's particularly handling of prepayment meter installations that adversely affected vulnerable customers. He proposed more stringent policies and better support for small businesses facing high energy costs. His relationship with key Labour frontbenchers, such as Shadow Chancellor Rachel Reeves and advocacy for green energy underscored Labour's commitment to creating a green economy.

Reynolds attended the 2024 World Economic Forum Annual Meeting in Davos, Switzerland. In January 2024, Reynolds was re-selected as the Labour candidate for Stalybridge and Hyde at the 2024 general election.

=== Business Secretary (2024–2025) ===
==== Appointment ====
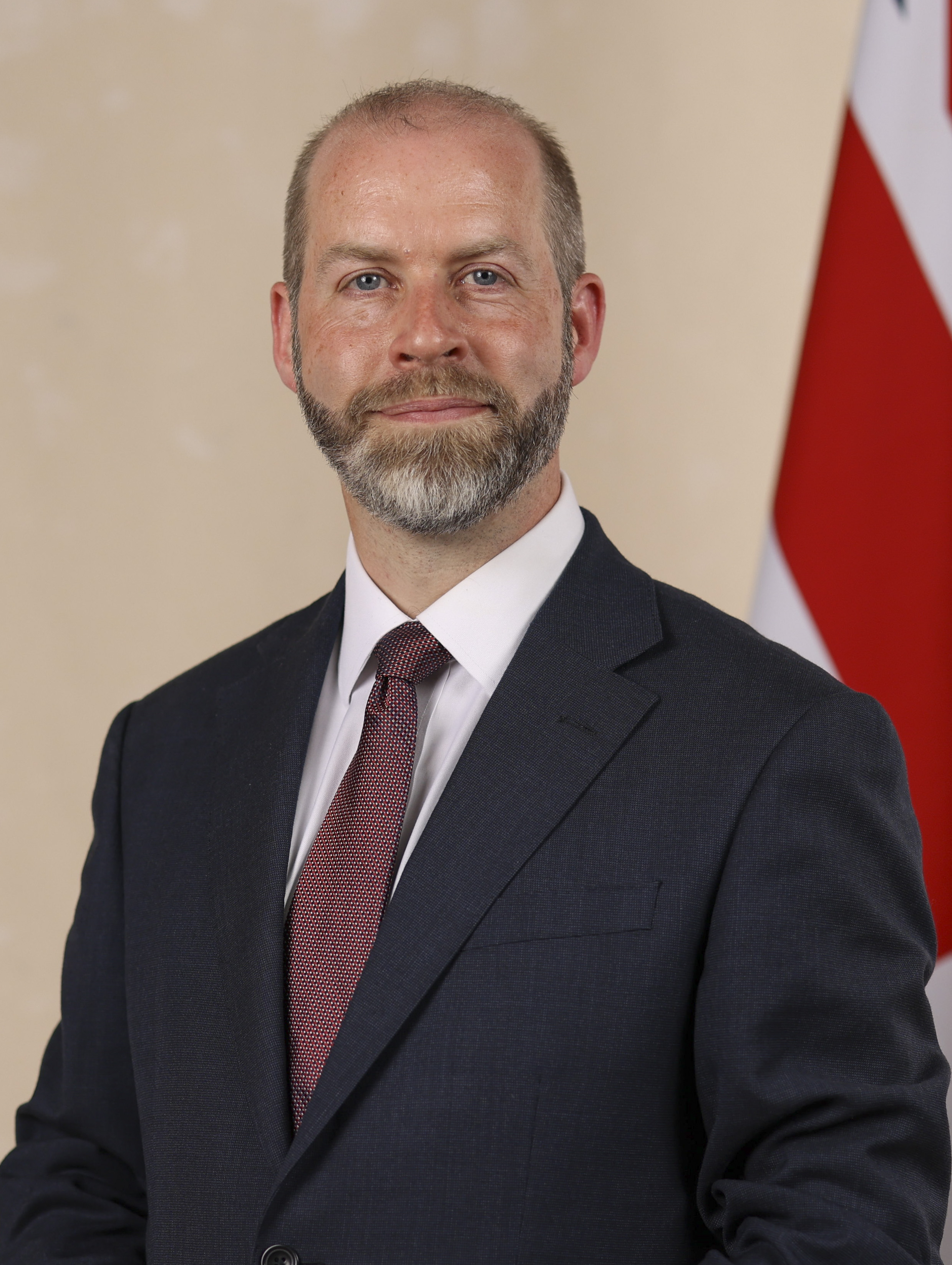
Official portrait, 2024

At the 2024 general election, Reynolds was again re-elected, with a decreased vote share of 43.8% and an increased majority of 8,539.

After the Labour Party's landslide victory in the general election, Reynolds was appointed as Secretary of State for Business and Trade and President of the Board of Trade by the new Prime Minister Keir Starmer in the ensuing formation of the new government. In one of his first statements as Business Secretary, Jonathan Reynolds ruled out moving to ID cards, seemingly contradicting a previous statement where he left the option open. While the context was crime, this has been interpreted as setting out a traditionalist, anti-technology stance and has been contrasted with Sir Tony Blair's call to embrace modern technology in the interests of economic growth, including digital ID cards. Reynolds was sworn into the Privy Council on 10 July 2024, entitling him to be styled "The Right Honourable" for life.

==== Workers' rights ====
Reynolds said that flexible work laws could reduce regional inequality and increase productivity as he criticised the previous Conservative government for “declaring war on people working from home”. He also expressed support for increasing the minimum wage, plans to ban zero-hours contracts, and an end to policies of fire and re-hire as part of Labour's Employment Rights Bill, which was unveiled in July's King's Speech. On 19 September 2024, Reynolds strongly criticised Amazon after it ordered employees back into office five days per week and defended employers who allowed workers to work from home, which included staff in his own government department. Reynolds said that workers should be judged "by their output, not whether they are sat at a desk". In an interview with The Times, Reynolds criticised the previous government and former ministers for their "bizarre approach towards working from home and "declaring war" on those who did not return to the office.

==== Investment policy ====
In an article to The Guardian, Reynolds said that plans will be put in place for opening new markets extending growth internationally for Britain by removing regressive business rates, time late payments for small businesses and position major institutions under the supervision of a new National Wealth Fund, which would invest in new green industries. Reynolds also affirmed that the government will be working alongside multination companies, regional councils, devolved governments and trade unions to "build a more resilient economy" with plans to transition Britain to clean energy by 2030. Following the controversial decision to scarp the winter fuel allowance from pensioners, Reynolds said that the government had "no choice" due to a £22 billion black hole in public finances and urged Labour MPs to back the issue. Reynolds alongside Douglas Alexander visited Saudi Arabia to meet officials on a new trade deal with the Gulf Cooperation Council in Riyadh which included United Arab Emirates. It came as a part of the government's attempts to boost economic growth and to drive investment within the country with Reynolds saying that "economic growth is this government's driving mission and boosting trade and investment with some of the world's biggest economies is crucial to that."

According to a September 2024 report in the Financial Times, Reynolds said that he was "sick" of losing potential investment opportunities to France and Spain. Reynolds stated that he would initiate plans on "how Britain intends to sell itself to the world" that would be presented before an international investment summit on 14 October with an "industrial strategy" that will draw new funds. Reynolds said that he would announce the next chair of the Global Council and that he would be working with "high calibre set of people".

==== Legal credentials ====
In February 2025, Reynolds faced calls to resign over accusations that he falsely claimed to be a solicitor, as his website and LinkedIn profile had claimed that he worked as a solicitor before becoming an MP, and in April 2014, he had told the House of Commons "Before the last election, I worked as a solicitor in Manchester city centre." Following this, he officially corrected the record in Parliament and apologised for both the "administrative error" on his LinkedIn page, flagged to him by the SRA, and for the use of shorthand in a speech "over a decade ago".

==== British Steel ====
Following concerns about the Jingye Group attempting to shut down its Scunthorpe site by intentionally not purchasing supplies of raw material required to operate its blast furnaces, Reynolds played a key role in taking control of British Steel in his role as Business Secretary. On 12 April 2025, he laid before Parliament the Steel Industry (Special Measures) Act, granting the Secretary of State powers to direct steelmaking operations in England and setting out penalties for noncompliance. This was passed through both Houses of Parliament in a single extraordinary sitting that required the full recall of Parliament from recess on a Saturday.

=== Chief Whip (2025–2026) ===
In the 2025 British cabinet reshuffle, Reynolds was appointed Chief Whip and Parliamentary Secretary to the Treasury on 5 September, replacing Alan Campbell.

=== Business Secretary (2026–present) ===
Following the 2026 Labour Party leadership crisis and subsequent ascendancy of Andy Burnham as prime minister, Reynolds was once again appointed business secretary by Burnham on 20 July 2026. He was given the additional responsibilities of Science and Innovation after the position of Secretary of State for Science, Innovation and Technology was abolished.

== Personal life ==
Reynolds lives in Stalybridge in Greater Manchester. His wife Claire, formerly Chair of the Labour Women's Network, was Keir Starmer's political director in Downing Street. He has four children, three with his wife Claire and one from a previous relationship; his eldest son is autistic. He is a member of the Fabian Society. Outside politics, his interests include supporting Sunderland A.F.C., films, and gardening.

== Notes ==
Parliament of the United Kingdom
Preceded by James Purnell	Member of Parliament for Stalybridge and Hyde; 2010–present	Incumbent
Political offices
Preceded by Luciana Berger	Shadow Minister for Energy and Climate Change; 2013–2015	Succeeded by Alan Whitehead
Preceded by Lilian Greenwood	Shadow Minister for Rail; 2015–2016	Succeeded by Andy McDonald
Preceded by Richard Burgon	Shadow Economic Secretary to the Treasury; 2016–2020	Succeeded by Pat McFadden
Preceded by Margaret Greenwood	Shadow Secretary of State for Work and Pensions; 2020–2021	Succeeded by Jonathan Ashworth
Preceded by Ed Miliband	Shadow Secretary of State for Business and Trade; 2021–2024	Succeeded by Kevin Hollinrake
Preceded by Kemi Badenoch	Secretary of State for Business and Trade; 2024–2025	Succeeded by Peter Kyle
Preceded by Alan Campbell	Chief Whip; 2025–2026	Incumbent
Preceded by Alan Campbell	Parliamentary Secretary to the Treasury; 2025–present	Incumbent
Party political offices
Preceded by Blair McDougall	Young Labour representative on the National Executive Committee of the Labour Party; 2003–2007	Succeeded by Stephanie Peacock
