= Allerton Grange School =

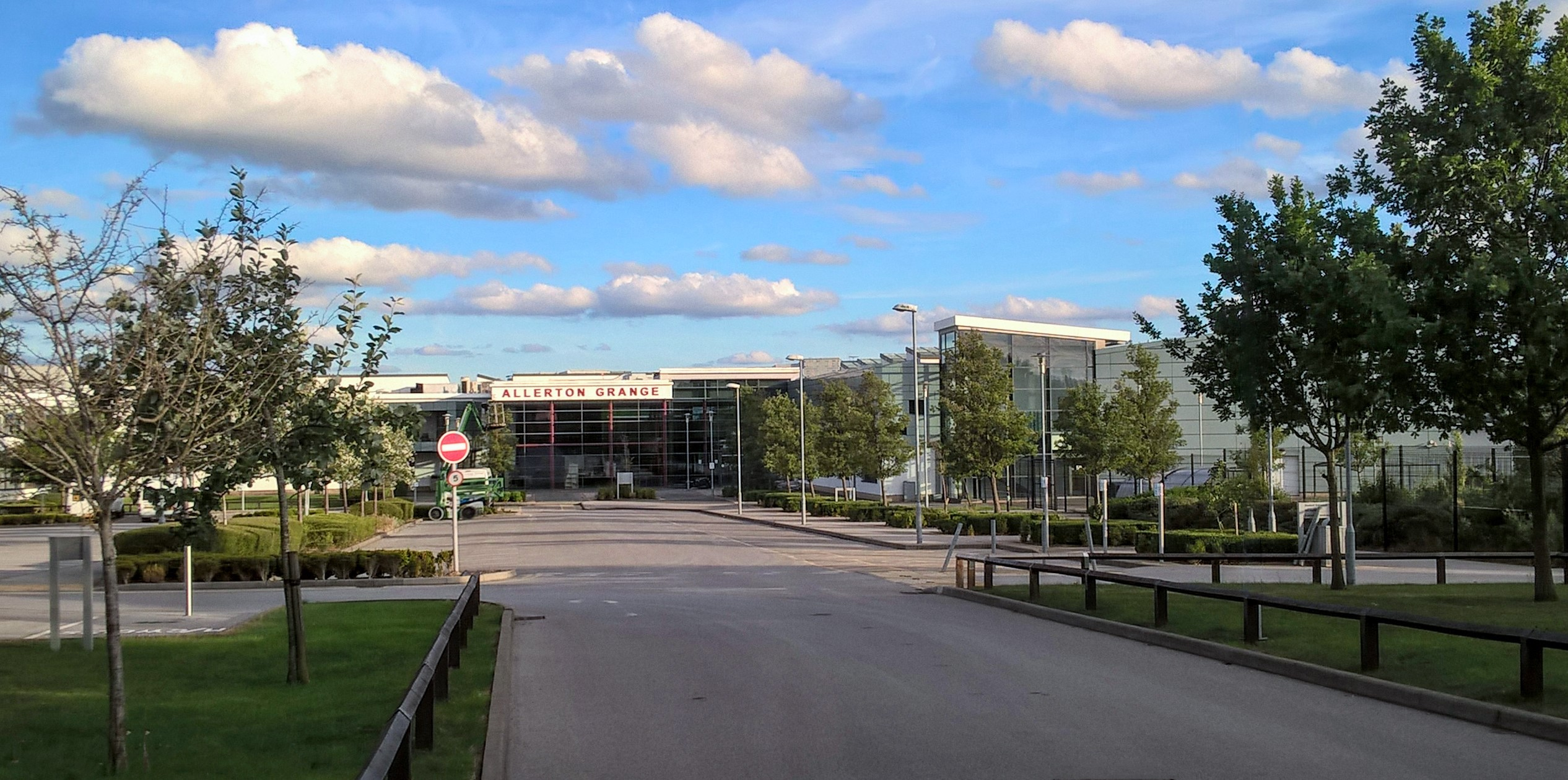
- Main entrance on Talbot Avenue

Location
- Talbot Avenue; Leeds, West Yorkshire, LS17 6SF; England; 53.84152°N 1.52259°W

Information
- Type: Community school
- Motto: Aspire, Grow, Succeed
- Established: 1953
- Local authority: City of Leeds
- Department for Education URN: 108058 Tables
- Ofsted: Reports
- Chair: Chesterfield
- Headteacher: Andy Norrington
- Gender: Coeducational
- Age: 11 to 18
- Enrolment: 1,645
- Colours: Navy blazer with school emblem, white shirt with tie, grey trousers or skirt, black shoes. http://www.allertongrange.com/News/New-School-Uniform/
- Website: http://www.allertongrange.com

Allerton Grange School is a coeducational secondary school and sixth form located in Moortown, Leeds, West Yorkshire, England. The school has around 1,500 pupils.

== History ==
Allerton Grange was established in 1953 in response to the natural increase in the number of school-aged children following the Second World War. It was built on part of the site of Allerton Grange – a medieval grange which was part of the Kirkstall Abbey estate. The grange itself no longer exists and housing has been erected on the site.

The original buildings were built in the 1950s (Middle School) and 1960s (High School) and equipped with a swimming pool and full size athletic track. In 1992 the two schools merged into one secondary modern school, which continued to use the buildings of the previous schools until a new school building was completed in 2009 as part of the Building Schools for the Future programme.

The demolition of the old school buildings was completed in 2010.

== Uniform ==
The school uniform consists of black shoes, grey tailored trousers or skirt, a white shirt and a navy blue blazer with the school emblem. Students wear a tie (navy and light blue for lower school, navy and red for upper school) and may also wear a grey jumper.

== School Emblem and Motto ==
The school emblem consists of the Yorkshire Rose and the year 1953, which is when the school was established. The school motto, as created by staff and agreed by students and parents, is 'Aspire, Grow, Succeed'.

== Ofsted ==
The school was last inspected in January 2020 and was judged as a school with an Ofsted rating of 'good'.

== Controversy ==
Just before a weekend of rallies held in support of the Palestinian people in May 2021, headteacher Mike Roper made a speech in an assembly requesting that the Palestinian Flag not be displayed around the school, as some people view it as a symbol of terrorism. This was recorded by a pupil on a mobile phone. It went viral on the internet causing sit down protests in other schools across England, (Note: Schools where protest were planned:Clapton Girls' Academy and Loreto High School, Chorlton) and by parents. The school and Leeds City Council issued a letter of apology a week later.

== Notable former pupils ==
- David Batty, former midfield player for Leeds United F.C.
- Jonathan Cainer, Daily Mail astrologer (left with no O-levels), started at the International Times
- Brian Deane, former Leeds United forward
- Marcus Harvey, artist
- Caleb Folan, former Hull City A.F.C., footballer
- Damien Hirst artist
- Jürgen Maier, Chief Executive since 2014 of Siemens UK
- Richard Naylor, former centre-back for Ipswich Town F.C.
- John Peacock, footballer
- John Porter (musician), music producer for The Smiths

== Notable former staff ==
- Henry Patterson (Jack Higgins), who wrote The Eagle Has Landed
