= List of acts of the Parliament of the United Kingdom from 2025 =

This is a list of acts of the Parliament of the United Kingdom passed in 2025.

Acts passed since 1963 are cited by calendar year, as opposed to the convention used for earlier acts of citing the regnal year(s) in which the relevant parliamentary session was held. Each act passed in a respective year is given a chapter number (abbreviated "c."), denoted by Arabic numerals in the case of public general acts, lowercase Roman numerals in the case of local acts, or italicised Arabic numerals in the case of personal acts. These run as separate series.

38 acts of Parliament were passed in 2025: 36 public general acts and 2 local acts.

indicates that an act has been transcribed on Wikisource, indicates that an act is available to view at legislation.gov.uk, and indicates the location of the original act in the Parliamentary Archives.

== Public general acts ==
Short title	Citation	Royal assent
Long title
Lords Spiritual (Women) Act 2015 (Extension) Act 2025	2025 c. 1	16 January 2025
An Act to extend the period within which vacancies among the Lords Spiritual are to be filled by bishops who are women.
Commonwealth Parliamentary Association and International Committee of the Red Cross (Status) Act 2025	2025 c. 2	16 January 2025
An Act to make provision about the status of, and privileges and immunities in connection with, the Commonwealth Parliamentary Association and the International Committee of the Red Cross; and for connected purposes.
Financial Assistance to Ukraine Act 2025	2025 c. 3	16 January 2025
An Act to make provision for loans or other financial assistance to be provided to, or for the benefit of, the government of Ukraine.
Arbitration Act 2025	2025 c. 4	24 February 2025
An Act to amend the Arbitration Act 1996; (Note: Arbitration Act 1996 (c. 23)) and for connected purposes.
Water (Special Measures) Act 2025	2025 c. 5	24 February 2025
An Act to make provision about the regulation, governance and special administration of water companies.
Supply and Appropriation (Anticipation and Adjustments) Act 2025	2025 c. 6	11 March 2025
An Act to authorise the use of resources for the years ending with 31 March 2024, 31 March 2025 and 31 March 2026; to authorise the issue of sums out of the Consolidated Fund for those years; and to appropriate the supply authorised by this Act for the years ending with 31 March 2024 and 31 March 2025.
Crown Estate Act 2025	2025 c. 7	11 March 2025
An Act to amend the Crown Estate Act 1961. (Note: Crown Estate Act 1961 (c. 55))
Finance Act 2025	2025 c. 8	20 March 2025
An Act to make provision about finance.
Church of Scotland (Lord High Commissioner) Act 2025	2025 c. 9	3 April 2025
An Act to make provision for persons of the Roman Catholic faith to be eligible to hold the office of His Majesty’s High Commissioner to the General Assembly of the Church of Scotland.
Terrorism (Protection of Premises) Act 2025 or Martyn's Law	2025 c. 10	3 April 2025
An Act to require persons with control of certain premises or events to take steps to reduce the vulnerability of the premises or event to, and the risk of physical harm to individuals arising from, acts of terrorism; to confer related functions on the Security Industry Authority; to limit the disclosure of information about licensed premises that is likely to be useful to a person committing or preparing an act of terrorism; and for connected purposes.
National Insurance Contributions (Secondary Class 1 Contributions) Act 2025	2025 c. 11	3 April 2025
An Act to make provision about secondary Class 1 contributions.
Non-Domestic Rating (Multipliers and Private Schools) Act 2025	2025 c. 12	3 April 2025
An Act to make provision for, and in connection with, the introduction of higher non-domestic rating multipliers as regards large business hereditaments, and lower non-domestic rating multipliers as regards retail, hospitality and leisure hereditaments, in England and for the removal of charitable relief from non-domestic rates for private schools in England.
Steel Industry (Special Measures) Act 2025	2025 c. 13	12 April 2025
An Act to make provision about powers to secure the continued and safe use of assets of a steel undertaking.
Institute for Apprenticeships and Technical Education (Transfer of Functions etc) Act 2025	2025 c. 14	15 May 2025
An Act to transfer the functions of the Institute for Apprenticeships and Technical Education, (Note: Institute for Apprenticeships and Technical Education.) and its property, rights and liabilities, to the Secretary of State; to abolish the Institute; and to make amendments relating to the transferred functions.
Bank Resolution (Recapitalisation) Act 2025	2025 c. 15	15 May 2025
An Act to make provision about recapitalisation costs in relation to the special resolution regime under the Banking Act 2009. (Note: Banking Act 2009 (c. 1))
Great British Energy Act 2025	2025 c. 16	15 May 2025
An Act to make provision about Great British Energy.
Sentencing Guidelines (Pre-sentence Reports) Act 2025	2025 c. 17	19 June 2025
An Act to make provision about sentencing guidelines in relation to pre-sentence reports.
Data (Use and Access) Act 2025	2025 c. 18	19 June 2025
An Act to make provision about access to customer data and business data; to make provision about services consisting of the use of information to ascertain and verify facts about individuals; to make provision about the recording and sharing, and keeping of registers, of information relating to apparatus in streets; to make provision about the keeping and maintenance of registers of births and deaths; to make provision for the regulation of the processing of information relating to identified or identifiable living individuals; to make provision about privacy and electronic communications; to establish the Information Commission; to make provision about information standards for health and social care; to make provision about the grant of smart meter communication licences; to make provision about the disclosure of information to improve public service delivery; to make provision about the retention of information by providers of internet services in connection with investigations into child deaths; to make provision about providing information for purposes related to the carrying out of independent research into online safety matters; to make provision about the retention of biometric data; to make provision about services for the provision of electronic signatures, electronic seals and other trust services; to make provision about works protected by copyright and the development of artificial intelligence systems; to make provision about the creation of purported intimate images; and for connected purposes.
Supply and Appropriation (Main Estimates) Act 2025	2025 c. 19	21 July 2025
An Act to authorise the use of resources for the year ending with 31 March 2026; to authorise both the issue of sums out of the Consolidated Fund and the application of income for that year; and to appropriate the supply authorised for that year by this Act and by the Supply and Appropriation (Anticipation and Adjustments) Act 2025. (Note: Supply and Appropriation (Anticipation and Adjustments) Act 2025 (c. 6))
Product Regulation and Metrology Act 2025	2025 c. 20	21 July 2025
An Act to make provision about the marketing or use of products in the United Kingdom; about units of measurement and the quantities in which goods are marketed in the United Kingdom; and for connected purposes.
Football Governance Act 2025	2025 c. 21	21 July 2025
An Act to establish the Independent Football Regulator; to make provision for the licensing of football clubs; to make provision about the distribution of revenue received by organisers of football competitions; and for connected purposes.
Universal Credit Act 2025	2025 c. 22	3 September 2025
An Act to make provision to alter the rates of the standard allowance, limited capability for work element and limited capability for work and work-related activity element of universal credit and the rates of income-related employment and support allowance.
Armed Forces Commissioner Act 2025	2025 c. 23	3 September 2025
An Act to establish, and confer functions on, the Armed Forces Commissioner; to abolish the office of Service Complaints Ombudsman; and for connected purposes.
Bus Services Act 2025	2025 c. 24	27 October 2025
An Act to make provision about local and school bus services; and for connected purposes.
Deprivation of Citizenship Orders (Effect during Appeal) Act 2025	2025 c. 25	27 October 2025
An Act to make provision about the effect, during an appeal, of an order under section 40 of the British Nationality Act 1981. (Note: British Nationality Act 1981 (c. 61))
Renters' Rights Act 2025	2025 c. 26	27 October 2025
An Act to make provision changing the law about rented homes, including provision abolishing fixed term assured tenancies and assured shorthold tenancies; imposing obligations on landlords and others in relation to rented homes and temporary and supported accommodation; and for connected purposes.
Absent Voting (Elections in Scotland and Wales) Act 2025	2025 c. 27	27 October 2025
An Act to make provision about absent voting in connection with local government elections in Scotland and Wales, elections to the Scottish Parliament and elections to Senedd Cymru; and for connected purposes.
Public Authorities (Fraud, Error and Recovery) Act 2025	2025 c. 28	2 December 2025
An Act to make provision about the prevention of fraud against public authorities and the making of erroneous payments by public authorities; about the recovery of money paid by public authorities as a result of fraud or error; and for connected purposes.
Property (Digital Assets etc) Act 2025	2025 c. 29	2 December 2025
An Act to make provision about the types of things that are not prevented from being objects of personal property rights.
Animal Welfare (Import of Dogs, Cats and Ferrets) Act 2025	2025 c. 30	2 December 2025
An Act to make provision for and in connection with restricting the importation and non-commercial movement of dogs, cats and ferrets.
Border Security, Asylum and Immigration Act 2025	2025 c. 31	2 December 2025
An Act to make provision about border security; to make provision about immigration and asylum; to make provision about sharing customs data and trailer registration data; to make provision about articles for use in serious crime; to make provision about serious crime prevention orders; to make provision about fees paid in connection with the recognition, comparability or assessment of qualifications; and for connected purposes.
Dogs (Protection of Livestock) (Amendment) Act 2025	2025 c. 32	18 December 2025
An Act to make provision changing the law about the offence of livestock worrying, including changes to what constitutes an offence and increased powers for investigation of suspected offences; and for connected purposes.
Mental Health Act 2025	2025 c. 33	18 December 2025
An Act to make provision to amend the Mental Health Act 1983 (Note: Mental Health Act 1983 (c. 20)) in relation to mentally disordered persons; and for connected purposes.
Planning and Infrastructure Act 2025	2025 c. 34	18 December 2025
An Act to make provision about infrastructure; to make provision about town and country planning; to make provision for a scheme, administered by Natural England, for a nature restoration levy payable by developers; to make provision about development corporations; to make provision about the compulsory purchase of land; to make provision about environmental outcomes reports; and for connected purposes.
Space Industry (Indemnities) Act 2025	2025 c. 35	18 December 2025
An Act to require operator licences authorising the carrying out of spaceflight activities to specify the licensee’s indemnity limit.
Employment Rights Act 2025	2025 c. 36	18 December 2025
An Act to make provision to amend the law relating to employment rights; to make provision about procedure for handling redundancies; to make provision about the treatment of workers involved in the supply of services under certain public contracts; to provide for duties to be imposed on employers in relation to equality; to amend the definition of "employment business" in the Employment Agencies Act 1973; (Note: Employment Agencies Act 1973 (c. 35)) to provide for the establishment of the School Support Staff Negotiating Body and Social Care Negotiating Bodies; to amend the Seafarers’ Wages Act 2023; (Note: Seafarers’ Wages Act 2023 (c. 8)) to make provision for the implementation of international agreements relating to maritime employment; to make provision about trade unions, industrial action, employers’ associations and the functions of the Certification Officer; to make provision about the enforcement of legislation relating to the labour market; and for connected purposes.

== Local acts ==
Short title	Citation	Royal assent
Long title
Norwich Livestock Market Act 2025	2025 c. i	21 July 2025
An Act to make provision for the relocation of Norwich Livestock Market; and for connected purposes.
General Cemetery Act 2025	2025 c. ii	27 October 2025
An Act to make new provision for the regulation and management of the General Cemetery Company upon its registration under the Companies Act 2006; (Note: Companies Act 2006 (c. 46)) to permit the transfer of the ownership and management of Kensal Green Cemetery (Note: Kensal Green Cemetery.) and West London Crematorium to a charity; and to confer powers upon the General Cemetery Company to extinguish rights of burial and disturb human remains in Kensal Green Cemetery for the purpose of increasing the space for interments; and for connected purposes.

== See also ==
- List of acts of the Parliament of the United Kingdom
