= Stoke Newington (ward) =

Electoral ward in London, England

- Electoral ward for the Hackney London Borough Council
- Stoke Newington ward boundaries since 2014
- Borough: Hackney
- County: Greater London
- Population: 13,382 (2021)
- Electorate: 10,028 (2022)
- Area: 0.9368 square kilometres (0.3617 sq mi)

Current electoral ward
- Created: 2014
- Number of members: 3
- Councillors: Susan Fajana-Thomas; Gilbert Smyth; Liam Davis
- Created from: Clissold, Lordship, Stoke Newington Central
- GSS code: E05009385

Stoke Newington is an electoral ward in the London Borough of Hackney. The ward was first used in the 2014 elections. It returns three councillors to Hackney London Borough Council.

== List of councillors ==
| Term | Councillor | Party |
|---|---|---|
| 2014–2018 | Louisa Thomson | Labour |
| 2014–present | Susan Fajana-Thomas | Labour |
| 2014–2024 | Mete Coban | Labour |
| 2018–present | Gilbert Smyth | Labour |
| 2024–present | Liam Davis | Green |

== Hackney council elections ==
=== 2024 by-election ===
The by-election took place on 12 September 2024, following the resignation of Mete Coban, who became Deputy Mayor of London for Environment and Energy. The Green Party's gain in Stoke Newington increased their representation on the council to three seats, the highest number they have held since 1992, when they held two seats.

2024 Stoke Newington by-election
| Party | Candidate | Votes | % | ±% |
|---|---|---|---|---|
| Green | Liam Davis | 1,253 | 53.0 | ▲19.5 |
| Labour | Zak Davies-Khan | 945 | 40.0 | ▼19.2 |
| Liberal Democrats | Thrusie Maursheth-Cahill | 78 | 3.3 | ▼8.2 |
| Conservative | Tareke Gregg | 74 | 3.1 | ▼4.1 |
| Independent | Tan Bui | 12 | 0.5 | new |
| Majority | | 308 | 13.0 | |
| Turnout | | 2,362 | 20.35 | |
| Green gain from Labour | | Swing | 19.5 | |

=== 2022 election ===
The election took place on 5 May 2022.

2022 Hackney London Borough Council election: Stoke Newington
| Party | Candidate | Votes | % | ±% |
|---|---|---|---|---|
| Labour | Mete Coban | 2,350 | 66.3 | |
| Labour | Susan Fajana-Thomas | 2,221 | 62.6 | |
| Labour | Gilbert Smyth | 1,831 | 51.6 | |
| Green | Charlene Concepcion | 1,332 | 37.6 | |
| Green | Siobhan MacMahon | 1,015 | 28.6 | |
| Green | Richard Scarborough | 580 | 16.4 | |
| Liberal Democrats | Thrusie Maurseth-Cahill | 407 | 11.5 | |
| Conservative | Anna Chomicz | 289 | 8.1 | |
| Conservative | Pauline Levy | 260 | 7.3 | |
| Conservative | Weronika Zolnierzak | 234 | 6.6 | |
| TUSC | Robert Thomas | 120 | 3.4 | |
| Majority | | 1,018 | | |
| Majority | | 889 | | |
| Majority | | 499 | | |
| Turnout | | | 38.6 | |
| Labour hold | | Swing | | |
| Labour hold | | Swing | | |
| Labour hold | | Swing | | |

=== 2018 election ===
The election took place on 3 May 2018.

2018 Hackney London Borough Council election: Stoke Newington
| Party | Candidate | Votes | % | ±% |
|---|---|---|---|---|
| Labour | Susan Fajana-Thomas | 2,605 | 64.1 | |
| Labour | Mete Coban | 2,581 | 63.5 | |
| Labour | Gilbert Smyth | 2,111 | 51.9 | |
| Green | Fiona Dowson | 991 | 24.4 | |
| Green | Elinor Lewis | 748 | 18.4 | |
| Green | Henry Greenwood | 627 | 15.4 | |
| Liberal Democrats | Juliette Bigley | 446 | 11.0 | |
| Liberal Democrats | Alton Hassan | 305 | 7.5 | |
| Liberal Democrats | John O'Brien | 299 | 7.4 | |
| Conservative | Pauline Levy | 232 | 5.7 | |
| Conservative | Diana Mikolajewska | 184 | 4.5 | |
| Conservative | Francis Nwokedi | 167 | 4.1 | |
| TUSC | Mick Cotter | 88 | 2.2 | |
| Majority | | | | |
| Turnout | | | 39.8 | |
| Labour hold | | Swing | | |
| Labour hold | | Swing | | |
| Labour hold | | Swing | | |

=== 2014 election ===
The election took place on 22 May 2014.

2014 Hackney London Borough Council election: Stoke Newington
| Party | Candidate | Votes | % | ±% |
|---|---|---|---|---|
| Majority | | | | |
| Turnout | | | | |
| | Labour win (new seat) | | | |
| | Labour win (new seat) | | | |
| | Labour win (new seat) | | | |
