= Jürgen Maier =

British-Austrian businessman

Jürgen Maier CBE FRS
- Born: Juergen Wolfgang Maier; 1964 (age 60–61); Germany
- Citizenship: British and Austrian
- Occupation(s): Businessman, engineer
- Known for: Former CEO of Siemens UK
- Website: juergenmaier.co.uk

Jürgen Wolfgang Maier CBE FRS or Juergen Wolfgang Maier (born 1964) is a British-Austrian businessman who is the chair of Great British Energy. He has been an advisor to the UK government, and from 2014 to 2019 was chief executive of Siemens UK.

== Early life and education ==
Maier was born in Germany, but holds Austrian and British citizenship. He lived in Karlsruhe. He came to the UK in 1974, to Leeds, where he went to school at Allerton Grange School, from 1978. He studied Production Engineering at Trent Polytechnic in Nottingham (now Nottingham Trent University) from 1982 to 1986.

== Career ==
Maier is the Chair of the Digital Catapult and co-founder of vocL, a platform empowering responsible business voices. He also supports development in northern regions and in that capacity is vice-Chair of the Northern Powerhouse Partnership and life time President for the North West Business Leadership Team.

Maier has occupied senior posts with Siemens, including managing director of UK and Ireland industry sector and Manufacturing Director of the Drives Factory in Congleton, Cheshire. He became a member of the Siemens UK Executive Management Board in October 2008, and was appointed Chief Executive on 1 July 2014. He retired in December 2019 at the age of 55.

== Recognition ==
Maier is a Fellow of the Institution of Engineering and Technology (IET) and the Royal Academy of Engineering, and is a visiting professor at the University of Manchester; he has also received Honorary Doctorates from the University of Salford, the University of Lincoln, Nottingham Trent University, the University of Sheffield, Cranfield University and Manchester Metropolitan University and, most recently, from Lancaster University.

He was a non-executive board member of the Department for Business, Innovation and Skills (BIS) of the UK government from 2014 to 2016 and led the 'Made Smarter' industrial strategy review and initiative which aimed to create a strong 4th Industrial Revolution in the UK. He was a member of the Industrial Strategy Council which provides impartial and expert advice to government.

In 2019, Insider Magazine named Maier as the most influential business person in North West England. He was ranked number 5 in Glassdoor's Top CEOs for 2019.

In July 2024 he was appointed as the chairman of Great British Energy, a government-owned body which promotes investment in renewable energy production.

== Personal life ==
Maier was appointed CBE in the 2019 New Year Honours and was elected a Fellow of the Royal Society in 2022.

Business positions
Preceded by	Chief Executive of Siemens UK; July 2014 – September 2019	Succeeded by
