= Great British Energy Act 2025 =

Act of the Parliament of the United Kingdom

Great British Energy Act 2025 (Note: Section 10(3).)
- Act of Parliament
- Parliament of the United Kingdom
- Long title: An Act to make provision about Great British Energy.
- Citation: 2025 c. 16
- Introduced by: Ed Miliband, Secretary of State for Energy Security and Net Zero (Commons); Lord Hunt, Minister of State for Energy Security and Net Zero (Lords)
- Territorial extent: England and Wales; Scotland; Northern Ireland; (Note: Section 10(1).)

Dates
- Royal assent: 15 May 2025
- Commencement: 15 May 2025 (Note: Section 10(2).)

Status: Current legislation

History of passage through Parliament

Text of statute as originally enacted

Revised text of statute as amended

The Great British Energy Act 2025 (c. 16) is an act of the Parliament of the United Kingdom which establishes Great British Energy, a publicly owned energy company. Overseen by the Secretary of State for Energy Security and Net Zero, the company is tasked with accelerating the development of clean, domestically produced energy in the United Kingdom and supporting the nation's net-zero commitments.

== Background ==
The proposal for Great British Energy was first announced by Keir Starmer at the Labour Party's 2022 conference. It was subsequently formalised as a key policy in the party's 2024 general election manifesto, Change. The party argued that public ownership would enable strategic long-term investment in energy infrastructure, ensure energy security, and return profits to the public sector.

== Legislative history ==
The bill was introduced to the House of Commons in July 2024 by Ed Miliband, the Secretary of State for Energy Security and Net Zero. It underwent detailed scrutiny and amendment in both Houses of Parliament, receiving cross-party support in some areas while facing opposition over issues such as funding transparency and government interference in energy markets.

Legislative consent motions were successfully sought from the Senedd, the Scottish Parliament and the Northern Ireland Assembly. The legislation was the first bill to receive legislative consent by all three devolved legislatures since the 2024 general election.

The bill received royal assent on 15 May 2025 and came into force on the same day.

== Provisions ==
The act sets out the statutory basis for the creation and operation of Great British Energy (GBE). Key provisions include:

- Establishment of GBE as a state-owned company with operational independence
- Powers to invest in, develop, and own energy generation infrastructure
- Obligations to promote environmental sustainability and deliver value for public money
- A requirement to publish annual reports to Parliament on finances, strategy, and project progress
- Provisions for ministerial oversight and appointment of a board of directors

The act also outlines the legal powers necessary for the company to enter partnerships with private firms, local authorities, and international investors, subject to government approval.

== Amendments ==
During its passage through Parliament, concerns were raised about modern slavery, following concerns raised about to materials such as solar panels manufactured in China.

An amendment proposed by members of the House of Lords was pre-empted by the government introducing its own proposed amendment with anti-slavery provisions, which was passed.

The Conservative Party proposed an amendment, moved by Lord Offord of Garvel, to hold GBE accountable for government predictions of cutting energy bills by £300, however, it was rejected.

== See also ==
- Premiership of Keir Starmer
- Energy law
- Energy policy of the United Kingdom
