= Norwich Livestock Market =

Livestock market in Norwich, England

Norwich Livestock Market is a livestock market located in Norwich, Norfolk, England.

== History ==
There was a Saxon-era market in the Tombland area in Norwich. It moved to the Mancraft area after the 1066 Norman conquest. By the 1300s, it sold several items, including fish, meat, cloth, vegetables, shoes and livestock. It was given a royal charter in 1341.

Norwich Market grew and became too congested, so, in 1738, a separate livestock market was created near Norwich Castle. The market has been located at Hall Road since the 1960s.

The market was closed for 18 months due to the 2001 United Kingdom foot-and-mouth outbreak, with the market reopening in August 2002.

The market has been protested on several occasions by animal rights protesters. Between 2017 and 2024, there were more than 150 individual animal rights protests.

Norwich Livestock Market Act 2025 (Note: Section 1.)
- Act of Parliament
- Parliament of the United Kingdom
- Long title: An Act to make provision for the relocation of Norwich Livestock Market; and for connected purposes.
- Citation: 2025 c. i

Dates
- Royal assent: 21 July 2025
- Commencement: 17 August 2025
Other legislation
| Relates to | Norwich City Council Act 1984 |

Status: Current legislation

History of passage through Parliament

Text of statute as originally enacted

Text of the Norwich Livestock Market as in force today (including any amendments) within the United Kingdom, from legislation.gov.uk.

The Norwich Livestock Market Act 2025 is a local act of the Parliament of the United Kingdom, so that Norwich City Council is able to relocate the market to a location outside of the City of Norwich.

Norwich City Council voted unanimously on 15 October 2024 to apply for a private bill. The Norwich Livestock Market Bill was passed by the House of Lords on 13 May 2025.

== Trade ==
The market is host to a periodic Ladies Day and Cattle Breeding Show.

The market has also featured the sale of bantams, quails, ducks, geese, rabbits, ferrets, guinea pigs, and ponies.
