= Public Authorities (Fraud, Error and Recovery) Act 2025 =

Act of the Parliament of the United Kingdom

Public Authorities (Fraud, Error and Recovery) Act 2025 (Note: Section 110.)
- Act of Parliament
- Parliament of the United Kingdom
- Long title: An Act to make provision about the prevention of fraud against public authorities and the making of erroneous payments by public authorities; about the recovery of money paid by public authorities as a result of fraud or error; and for connected purposes.
- Citation: 2025 c. 28
- Introduced by: Liz Kendall (Commons); Baroness Sherlock (Lords)
- Territorial extent: England and Wales; Scotland (except part 1); (Note: Section 108.)

Dates
- Royal assent: 2 December 2025
- Commencement: Various (Note: Section 109.)
Other legislation
Amends	Limitation Act 1980; Road Traffic Offenders Act 1988; Social Security Administration Act 1992; Social Security Fraud Act 2001; Criminal Justice and Police Act 2001; Proceeds of Crime Act 2002; Police Reform Act 2002; Police and Fire Reform (Scotland) Act 2012 (Consequential Provisions and Modifications) Order 2013; Investigatory Powers Act 2016
Relates to	Police and Criminal Evidence Act 1984

Status: Partly in force

History of passage through Parliament

Text of statute as originally enacted

Revised text of statute as amended

The Public Authorities (Fraud, Error and Recovery) Act 2025 (c. 28) is an act of the Parliament of the United Kingdom. It is primarily intended to combat benefit fraud. It grants new powers to the Public Sector Fraud Authority and Department for Work and Pensions.

== Passage ==
The bill received its first reading in the Commons on 22 January 2025, its second reading on 3 February 2025 and its third reading on 29 April 2025. It received its first reading in the Lords on 30 April 2025, its second reading on 15 May 2025 and its third reading on 23 October 2025. The act received Royal Assent on 2 December 2025.

== Provisions ==
The legislation is divided into two parts, the first of which outlines the powers that can be used on behalf of public authorities and the second of which is focused on social security. Part 1 includes provisions such as investigatory powers, powers of entry, search and seizure, deals with recovery of money received that should not have been received and penalties. Part 2 provides the Department for Work and Pensions with significantly increased powers in relation to investigating fraud, including the right to enter, search and seize property.

In October 2026, the Department for Work and Pensions issued its first Eligibility Verification Notice to banks, which requires banks to provide financial information which will help the Department for Work and Pensions to determine whether a benefit recipient meets eligibility criteria, such as whether a person has too much savings to be eligible to receive benefits and whether a person is out of the country for too long to receive benefits. In response to this, Lilian Greenwood commented that "Benefit fraudsters should be looking over their shoulder".

In regards to people who have received overpayments from the Department for Work and Pensions, the legislation allows the government to recoup money owed directly from the bank accounts of individuals who owe money, without them having to seek a court order, or deduct money owed directly from an individuals salary via Pay As You Earn.

Another provision in the legislation is that if people stop receiving benefits and owe the Department for Work and Pensions more than £1,000, they can apply to a court so that the person has their driving licence revoked.

== Opposition ==
The organisation Justice raised a number of concerns about the proposed legislation. Such as the act allowing the Department for Work and Pensions to access financial information without there being any suspicion of wrongdoing, the act providing the ability to "enter, search and seize property of benefits recipients they suspect of fraud" and it giving them the option of using reasonable force in relation to entry searches and seizure powers.
