= Jingye Group =

Chinese long steel products company

- Native name: 敬业集团
- Type: Private
- Industry: Steel industry
- Founded: 1988
- Headquarters: Beijing
- Key people: Li Ganpo (chairman BoD)
- Products: Sheet steel, plates, bars, concrete reinforcement, profiles, wire, rails, pipes
- Revenue: ¥ 238 billion (2021, approx. €33 billion)
- Number of employees: 31,000
- Website: www.jingyesteel.com.cn

Jingye Group (Chinese: 敬业集团) is a Chinese private steelmaker and long steel products company headquartered in Beijing. The group was also active in Europe from 2020 to 2026 through the acquisition of British Steel Limited.

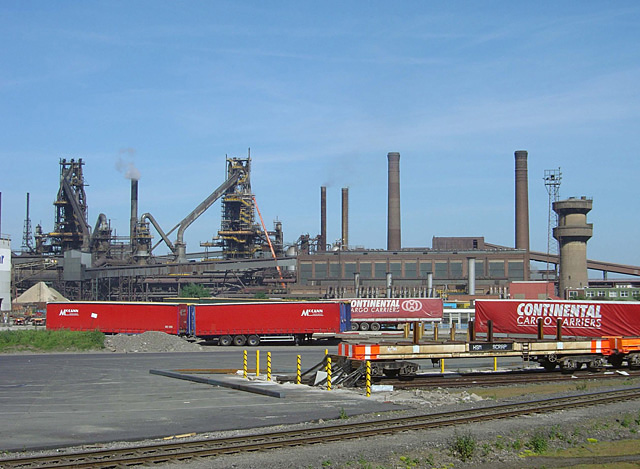
The blast furnaces at Scunthorpe Steelworks in 2006. The first blast furnace at this plant came into operation in 1864.

== Corporate affairs ==
Jingye is a major producer of concrete reinforcement, round bars, medium steel plates and galvanized and painted sheet steel. The Chinese construction sector is a major customer but the group also exports globally.

In addition to steel production, the group is also active in the chemical and pharmaceutical industry, international trade, finance, logistics, tourism, holiday resorts and hotels, real estate and 3D printing with metal powder.

== History ==
In 1985, former teacher Li Ganpo founded a privately owned canning factory and a brewery in Pingshan, not far from Beijing. Three years later, he founded the Jingye chemical factory. The word "jingye" means "dedication".

In 2002, the group also entered steel production and developed activities in other sectors such as transport and tourism. The production of steel and processed steel products grew to become the group's core business. The company also built roads, houses and schools, and provided health care and higher education for its employees and the community. From 2008, Li also served on the 11th National People's Congress.

In 2020, Jingye acquired British Steel out of insolvency, preserving around 3,200 jobs at the Scunthorpe steelworks and other UK operations. Following the takeover, Jingye said it invested more than £1.2 billion to maintain British Steel's operations amid difficult market conditions, tariffs, and rising environmental costs. By 2025, the company stated that British Steel was losing around £700,000 per day as negotiations with the UK government over support for new electric arc furnaces failed.

In 2025, the British government took control of a steel mill owned by Jingye citing national security reasons. The Economist questioned the strength of the national security rationale, noting that much of the steel used by Britain's defence industry was already imported including "steel for submarine hulls and thin-plate shipbuilding" and that British steelworks themselves relied heavily on imported raw materials.

On 16 July 2026, the UK government brought British Steel into public ownership under the Steel Industry (Nationalisation) Act 2026 to prevent the closure of the Scunthorpe Steelworks. In response, China's Ministry of Commerce expressed strong dissatisfaction with the nationalisation, describing the takeover as a "severe blow" to the confidence of Chinese firms investing in the UK. An independent assessor is to decide whether Jingye should be compensated.

== Plants ==
Company	Location	Acquisition	Products	Crude steel capacity
Jingye Steel	Shijiazhuang	n.a.	bars, plates, sheet steel	12 mt/year
(Inner Mongolia) Ulanhot Steel	Ulanhot	2014	concrete reinforcement, round bars	1.05 mt/year
Yunnan Jingye Steel (Yunnan Yongchang Steel)	Anning	2020	concrete reinforcement	1.7 mt/year
Guangdong Jingye Steel (Guangdong Taidu Steel)	Jieyang	2020	concrete reinforcement	1.2 mt/year
