= Nahmad =

Nahmad is a surname. Notable people with the surname include:

- David Nahmad (born 1947), Monegasque billionaire art dealer
- Ezra Nahmad (born 1945), Monegasque billionaire art dealer and collector
- Joseph Nahmad (born 1990), American art dealer
- Giuseppe Nahmad (1932–2012), Italian art dealer of Syrian Jewish descent
- Helly Nahmad:
  - Helly Nahmad (London), British art dealer
  - Helly Nahmad (New York art collector), American art dealer
