= Massimo Agostinelli =

Swiss artist (born 1987)

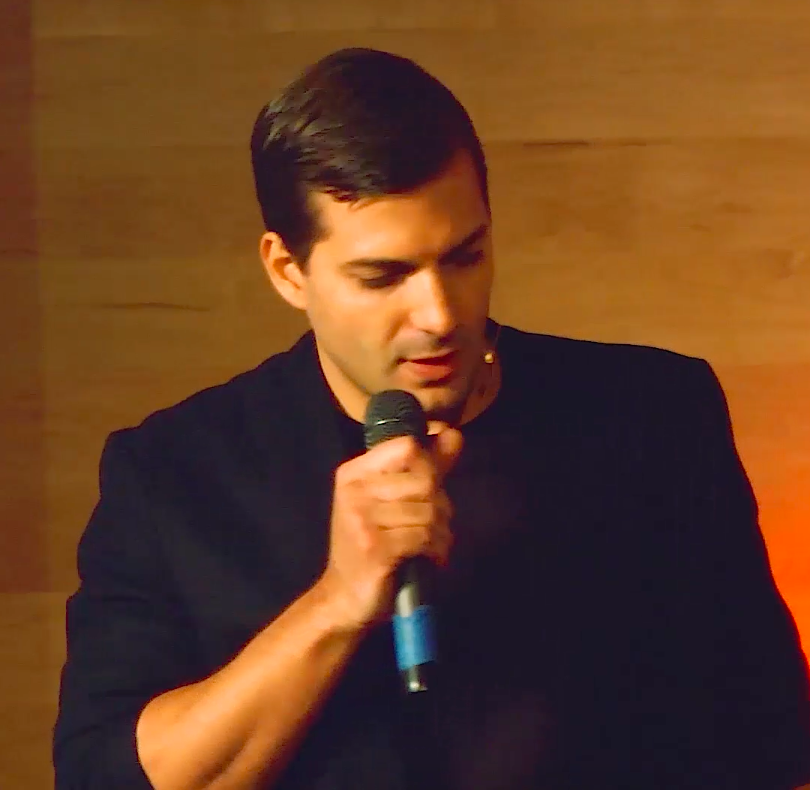
- Agostinelli in 2019
- Born: September 25, 1987 (age 39); London, England
- Education: Webster University (B.A); George Herbert Walker School of Business & Technology (B.A)
- Known for: Visual arts / Art intervention / Venture Capital
- Spouse: Luciana Agostinelli (m. 2016)
- Father: Robert Agostinelli (father)
- Relatives: Rolf Theiler (father in law)
- Website: t1p.com

Massimo Agostinelli (born 25 September 1987) is a Switzerland-based American Italian artist and businessman who uses text, word play and found objects in his works with a particular focus on interventions.

== Early life ==
Agostinelli was born in London, England and grew up in Manhattan, New York. His father is Robert Agostinelli an Italian American billionaire financier, his mother is Pascale Gallais, a Parisian Greek sculptor. Later he graduated from Webster University. Back in London, Agostinelli became an apprentice printmaker and type setter.

== Entrepreneurship ==
Agostinelli started his first internet company Myhomepage.com in 2009 and soon after became an early Tesla shareholder which led him to focus on the Elon Musk ecosystem and is a self proclaimed Musketeer Disciple. Agostinelli manages his family office Think 1st Principles (T1P) based on the core philosophy of “think first principles“. applied to long term Muskonomy investments.

== Art career ==
His first art series, Palindromes, consisted of mirror sheets imprinted with iconic images from art, history and popular culture, overlaid with palindromes. His Anagrams examined pop-culture icons by morphing their names into anagrams by means of lenticular printing. In 2016 and 2019 Agostinelli was selected by Simon de Pury to exhibit at Dallas Contemporary for the MTV Staying Alive Foundation with Enoc Perez and Marc Quinn curated by Neville Wakefield. In 2017 he participated in "the first Instagram curated art exhibition" by Avant Arte and Unit London and in 2019 Altamarea Group's Michelin starred Marea commissioned a diptych for their flagship New York and Dubai restaurants. Agostinelli is also among the permanent private collection of the Alpina Gstaad as well as a founding patron of the Zeitz Museum of Contemporary Art Africa. He has worked with various philanthropic organisations including, AmfAR, UNICEF, Caudwell Children, Innocence In Danger and the Laureus Foundation.

== Interventions ==
To mark the 100th anniversary of Marcel Duchamp's 1917 Fountain, Agostinelli installed a steel trashcan at the 2017 Art Basel fair in Switzerland with the phrase "la plus belle" written on top of it with white acrylic marker. (In French, it means "the most beautiful", but it is also a pun on "la poubelle", French for "the garbage bin".) The bin was positioned in front of the art booths Hauser & Wirth and White Cube. It was hailed; "one of the most engaging works made in 2017" by a member of the Nahmad clan. The original trash can was subsequently exhibited at Galerie von Vertes in Zürich. Artnet praised the institutional critique performance art installation by stating; Agostinelli "turned trash cans into treasure", while Vanity Fair drew reference to Duchamp.

Agostinelli returned to the fair in 2018 during the VIP opening, planting a basil plant in the Gagosian Gallery booth directly in front of a John Chamberlain sculpture flanked by Roy Lichtenstein and Mark Rothko works. As another nod to the Basel/basil pun, he turned the water in the fountain outside the Messeplatz green on opening day. Members of his entourage who witnessed the intervention included, Helly Nahmad, Joseph Nahmad, David Mugrabi and Nellee Hooper, all of which was later dubbed "the green invasion" by art historian Diana Picasso.

In 2019 Agostinelli staged his third consecutive site-specific conceptual art installation at Art Basel. Placing a real dead rat with a tag attached to its tail, reading 'Blase' - entitling the work Rat Blase, which is an anagram of 'Art Basel'. The rat was situated between Beyeler Foundation, David Zwirner Gallery and Helly Nahmad Gallery in reference to the rat race. In an interview with Forbes Agostinelli cited as partial inspiration, Vito Schnabel's exhibition by The Bruce High Quality Foundation, The New Colossus. In addition, Joseph Nahmad stated; "The power of Agostinelli's work is to be able to show the viewer that today's art world has no boundaries."

For the 2019 Frieze Art Fair in London, Agostinelli staged an intervention by depositing a 1 tonne block of translucent ICE (Internal Combustion Engine) pulled by a Tesla Model X to the entrance of the fair on opening day. Entitling the work 'Freeze', a homophone of 'Frieze'. Additionally, he placed another sculpture in the shape of 'XX' in front of White Cube's booth, referencing the 2.0 °C climatic tipping point. The Art Newspaper compared it to Olafur Eliasson's 'Ice Watch' installation outside Tate Modern. Forbes compared it to Andy Goldsworthy's 'Snow Ball' installation. Agostinelli said his initial inspiration derived from examining the Parthenon Frieze from the Acropolis of Athens at the British Museum.

During the 2021 Art Basel Miami Beach fair Agostinelli installed an intervention involving a Batman mask and two inflatable bats - entitling the work ‘Real Bats’ in black acrylic, an anagram of ‘Art Basel’. Written on verso was the simile ‘as blind as a bat’, highlighting the homograph, ‘bats’ and dated in palindromic format 12.2.21 / 12.02.2021. Forbes stated; "Agostinelli is truly dedicated in supporting Musk’s vision and raising awareness through art activism in order to help accelerate the world's transition to sustainable energy."

== Solo exhibitions ==
- Palindromes, London, 2014
- Anagrams, New York, 2015
- Constellations, Cape Town, 2016
- Elements, London, 2017
- Perspectives, Gstaad, 2018
- Signs, London, 2019
- Interventions, 2020
