= Meyohas =

Meyohas is a surname. Notable people with the surname include:

- Marc Meyohas (born 1971), French businessman
- Nathaniel Meyohas (born 1974), French businessman
- Sarah Meyohas (born 1991), French-American artist
