= Love in Exile =

Love in Exile may refer to:

== Music ==
- Love in Exile (Arooj Aftab, Vijay Iyer, and Shahzad Ismaily album), 2023
- Love in Exile (Eddy Grant album), 1980
- Love in Exile, 1997 album by the Chrome Cranks
- "Love in Exile", 2026 song by Charlie Puth, from Whatever's Clever!

== Books ==
- Love in Exile, 1936 novel by Dorothy Black
- Love in Exile, 1995 novel by Bahaa Taher
- Love in Exile, 1999 memoir by Edith Anderson
- "Love in Exile", short story by André Maurois
- Love in Exile, 2025 non-fiction book by Shon Faye

== Other ==
- Love in Exile (film), 1936
- "Love in Exile", art exhibition by Henrik Aarrestad Uldalen
- Love in Exile, poetry collection by Dirwish Al Asywti
