= Arendz =

Arendz is a surname. Notable people with the surname include:

- Errol Arendz (born 1953), South African fashion designer
- Mark Arendz (born 1990), Canadian biathlon and Para-Nordic skier
