= Helly Nahmad =

Helly Nahmad may refer to either of two cousins, both art dealers and gallery owners:

- Helly Nahmad (London), owner of Helly Nahmad London, and son of Ezra Nahmad
- Helly Nahmad (New York art collector), owner of Helly Nahmad Gallery in New York, and son of David Nahmad
