= Aarrestad =

Aarrestad is a Norwegian surname. Notable people with the surname include:

- Sven Aarrestad (1850–1942), a Norwegian writer and politician
- Unn Aarrestad (born 1938), a Norwegian politician

== See also ==
- Henrik Aarrestad Uldalen (born 1986), Norwegian oil painter
