= Julio Reyes (artist) =

American contemporary artist

Julio Reyes (born January 15, 1982) is an American contemporary artist. Reyes grew up in Los Angeles and was an athlete when he was young. But he had a greater passion for art and earned a Bachelor of Fine Arts in painting and drawing with a minor in sculpture at the Laguna College of Art and Design in 2005.

In 2011, Reyes had his debut solo exhibition at Arcadia Gallery in New York. Reyes’s work has been exhibited all around the world and awarded numerous prizes by Portrait Society of America, the Art Renewal Center, the California Art Club.

== Biography ==
Reyes was born in Hollywood and was raised in the urban area of Los Angeles. In his youth, Reyes was a talented athlete and soccer player who brought recruiters calling with offers of scholarships. Reyes had played in championship games around the world and could have taken the path of a professional soccer player. But on a team trip to France, he decided instead to pursue a career in art.

In grade school, Reyes discovered that he was partially colorblind. He has difficulty distinguishing between reds, greens, purples, and blues, as well as between warms and cools. As a result, Reyes had to learn careful color mixing based on his weaknesses.

After graduating from college, Reyes married a fellow artist, Candice Bohannon. They have relocated to Texas, where they started offering workshops for the first time.

== Painting style ==
The human capacity to love, dream, and preserve is the source of inspiration in Reyes's art. His works focus on intimate dramas, revealing brief moments of unnoticed grandeur that are often missed in the hustle of modern existence and tender souls grappling with the pressures of life.

Reyes uses specific colors within predominantly monochromatic artworks. He avoids varied color mixtures, a technique attributed to his color blindness.

== Exhibitions ==
=== Solo exhibitions ===
- 2020, Arcadia Contemporary, Los Angeles
- 2014, Vessels, Arcadia Contemporary, New York
- 2011, Premier Exhibition, Arcadia Gallery, New York

=== Group exhibitions ===
- 2016, "International Art Renewal Center Salon Exhibition", Museum of Modern Art (MEAM) Barcelona, Spain
- 2016, Water Water Everywhere, Arcadia Contemporary, Los Angeles
- 2015, Paintguide, The Unit Gallery, London, England
