= Nathaniel Meyohas =

French businessman (born 1974)

Nathaniel Jerome Meyohas
- Born: May 29, 1974 (age 52)
- Education: New York University (MBA)
- Known for: Founder of Blandford Capital; Co-founder of Greybull Capital
- Spouse: Micheala Nahmad
- Family: Marc Meyohas (brother); Sarah Meyohas (sister); Ezra Nahmad (father-in-law); Helly Nahmad (brother-in-law)

Nathaniel Jerome Meyohas (born May 29, 1974) is a London-based French businessman who is a founding partner of Blandford Capital. Until 2018 Meyohas was a partner at Greybull Capital.

== Biography ==
Meyohas was born in Paris, France to a Sephardi Jewish family. His sister is New York artist Sarah Meyohas. His brother is Marc Meyohas who is also a business partner. He attended Clifton College in Bristol, United Kingdom and is a graduate of the New York University Leonard N. Stern School of Business from where he received an MBA in 2001. Meyohas worked as an investment banker with Lehman Brothers from 1996 to 1999; and then as a principal with Sun Capital Partners from 2003 to 2010.

== Personal life ==
Meyohas is married to Micheala Nahmad, daughter of art dealer Ezra Nahmad and sister of Helly Nahmad.
