= Greybull Capital =

British private investment company

Greybull Capital LLP
- Type: Limited liability partnership
- Industry: Investment
- Founded: 1 April 2010; 16 years ago
- Headquarters: 32 Sloane Street, Knightsbridge, SW1X 9NR, London, United Kingdom
- Key people: Marc Meyohas; Daniel Goldstein
- Website: www.greybull.co.uk
- Footnotes; Registered Nr.OC354497

Greybull Capital LLP is a private investment company that specialises in medium- to long-term investments in UK-based companies. It was incorporated as a limited liability partnership in April 2010. After the 2008 financial crisis, Greybull's declared strategy was to buy distressed firms and return them to success.

By 2019, Greybull had bought several struggling firms for low prices, but many of them had subsequently failed. Examples include the airline Monarch, sports bar and snooker hall chain Riley's, the M Local convenience store chain, and electrical goods retailer Comet. Greybull bought British Steel, Britain's second-largest steelworks, for £1 in 2016, invested £20 million in the company, and charged it £6M in fees and accrued £14M of owed interest in the years after. British Steel became insolvent in May 2019, after failing to secure government funding.

Greybull was criticised in 2019 by Lord Myners for its track record of making money from failed investments.

== Structure ==
Greybull Capital's two members are Marc Meyohas and Greybull Corporate Partner Ltd, formed in July 2012 and owned by Marc Meyohas. Greybull Capital is run by Marc Meyohas and Daniel Goldstein.

== History ==
Greybull Capital was started in April 2010 and was, until 2018, run by brothers Marc and Nathaniel Meyohas and long-standing family friend Richard Perlhagen. Greybull was set up to invest the wealth of the two families, whose ties go back forty years. Marc and Nathaniel Meyohas's father is a French corporate lawyer. Perlhagen's father owned a Swedish pharmaceutical operation which was sold for over £10M.

In September 2018, Nathaniel Meyohas quit Greybull to launch a turnaround fund. In November 2018, Richard Perlhagen stopped being a Greybull director and Daniel Goldstein, a former equity derivatives specialist with Lehman Brothers, became the second director.

== Buy-outs, backing and negotiations ==
=== New Era; petroleum, 2010 ===
Greybull backed New Era Petroleum Inc, since 2010 with both working capital to develop its activities and capital to acquire and re-develop oil fields in the US.

New Era of Wyoming, USA owns The Greybull Field oil well in Greybull, Wyoming.

=== Plessey; semiconductors, 2010 ===
Greybull supported management's plans to restructure and re-develop Plessey Semiconductors Ltd, of Plymouth, Devon, since 2010 and has financed add-on acquisitions.

=== Comet; electrical retailer, acquired 2011; insolvent 2014 ===
Greybull led the backers of OpCapita's buyout of Comet, November 2011, a 236-store business, employing 7,000 for £2; plus a £50M dowry paid by the past owner. Comet of Hull, UK, went into administration November 2012. Comet closed its last stores in December 2012. Comet's administrators, Deloitte, said the collapse would cost the UK government £23M in redundancy payments and £26.4M in tax owed; Deloitte's figures showed OpCapita recouped almost £120M from the insolvency. A tribunal ruled, June 2014, that Comet did not follow redundancy rules, so an additional £26M must be paid by the UK Government, on top of the statutory redundancy it previously paid. Comet's collapse dubbed the biggest raid in British corporate history, November 2014. A Government statement said “The Secretary of State has concerns about the financial burden placed on the taxpayer caused by the collapse of companies such as Comet and is considering the options available”.

=== Rileys; sports bars; acquired 2012; insolvent 2014 ===
Greybull acquired Rileys, a UK sports bars and snooker hall group, through a pre-pack administration in 2012. It was reported, Pre-packs can be controversial as they allow the new owner to shed a company's previous debts. Greybull shed about half of Rileys sites. Greybull tried to sell the company in summer 2014, but no buyer was forthcoming and Rileys was placed in administration for a second time 15 September 2014. In 2016, there were 30 Rileys Sports Bars in the UK, owned by Rileys Sports Bars (2014) Ltd.

=== Metalrax; baking equipment, 2013 ===
Marc and Nathaniel Meyohas of Greybull Capital, the directors of Bowman Birmingham, which acquired Metalrax out of administration. Almost 400 jobs were secured; April 2013. KPMG, an auditing service, reported into the pre-packaged insolvency, showed: Greybull paid more than £8M. The deal left the group pension deficit of £16.9M as an unsecured creditor, with chances of repayment now in the hands of the Pension Protection Fund. A solvent offer was on the table before Metalrax's collapse, Grove Industries were report to be disappointed not to conclude a transaction in the time available.

=== Arc; engineering, acquired 2013; sold 2017 ===
Greybull fully financed Arc Specialist Engineering Ltd, a conglomerate of businesses in the steel industry and became its majority shareholder The business born in 2013 from the collapse of Metalrax Group was returning to profits.; Greybull sold Arc (Europe's largest producer of high quality non-stick coated steel for the bakeware industry) to a management buy-out, backed by Mobeus Equity Partners, July 2017.

=== Constar UK; plastic bottles maker, 2014 ===
Greybull Capital purchased the UK arm of Constar International Holdings for £4.3M, through Sherburn Acquisitions, a vehicle set up to handle the transaction; February 2014.

=== Murco; fuel stations and refinery, 2014 (negotiations only) ===
Greybull reported to be in "an advanced stage" in negotiations with Murcom at Milford Haven; Reuters reported "The $500m deal could be signed in mid-April"; March 2014.

=== Monarch; airline, acquired 2014; administration 2017 ===
Greybull purchased 90% of Monarch Holdings Ltd, a UK airline, trading as Monarch, 25 October 2014 in return for £50M capital commitment: the remaining 10% passed to Monarch's pension scheme. Greybull's investment secured £125M of capital and liquidity facilities. Restructuring involved reducing its aircraft from 42 to 34, 700 redundancies and wage reductions. The Financial Times reported, that since Greybull bought Monarch, the airline has been transformed. Monarch delivering its 1st profit in three years in 2015. Greybull employed Deutsche Bank in April 2016 to 'explore strategic options for Monarch Airlines', including growth opportunities in Europe and selling it. Monarch Airlines seeking in June 2016 to secure £35M either from Greybull or a 3rd party. Amid rumors of imminent bankruptcy in September 2016 Monarch's ATOL aviation insurance was extended for 2 weeks by fresh investment, and by then, £165M of Greybull investment renewed Monarch's annual licence.
Monarch ceased trading on Monday 2 October 2017, leaving 860,000 passengers without flights and is Greybull's third venture that has failed. Greybull Capital's founder, Marc Meyohas, blamed sterling's weakness, Middle East terrorism and Brexit for the airline's demise. The biggest in British aviation history.

During administration, it was reported that Greybull's losses were limited, as Monarch had £48M cash in bank, and £60M of landing slots to sell. After administration, it was reported that most of Monarch's £165M bailout had come from Boeing and not as reported, from its owner Greybull. Boeing injected more than £100M into Monarch's offshore holding company, 'Petrol Jersey'. Boeing's cash injection arose from an order of 32, 737 Max planes, finalised after Greybull's acquisition. None had been delivered when Monarch was liquidated. Greybull responded that financing details were 'commercially confidential'.

Monarch's liquidation was debated in Parliament, the week commencing 9 October. Sir Vince Cable, MP, said: “The lack of transparency is shocking. Customers, staff and taxpayers deserve to know how Monarch was funded"

Greybull acquired Monarch Aircraft Engineering Ltd (MAEL) as a part of Monarch Airlines. MAEL announced, it was not part of the liquidation and would continue as a standalone business, employing over 730 staff The FT reported that Boeing had paid £10-15M into a joint venture involving Monarch's engineering services unit, which was not placed in administration.

The transport minister urged Greybull to contribute towards the £60M bill of repatriating Monarch's 110,000 stranded passengers. The FT reported that some initially suggested that Greybull lost £250M in Monarch's collapse, but they calculated that Greybull, as preferential creditor and owner of MAEL, worth about £60M, may walk away with a £15M profit from the liquidation, leaving staff, customers and tax-payers to stump up the shortfall.

On 4 January 2019, MAEL also fell into Administration with the loss of 408 jobs.

=== M Local; convenience stores, acquired from Morrisons 2015; insolvent 2016 ===
British supermarket chain Morrisons sold its "M Local" convenience store subsidiary to a team led by retail entrepreneur Mike Greene, backed by Greybull Capital, for £25M, incurring a loss of about £30M. Under Greybull's ownership, 140 stores were rebranded ‘My Local’, safeguarding jobs of the 2,300 staff. M local's operating loss for 2014 was £36M.

Greybull put My Local into administration June 2016, 9 months after buying it. Ninety stores closed, more than 1,200 shop workers laid off, some without redundancy pay; the remaining 35 stores reportedly sold. Morrisons offered to rehire former employees who lost their jobs. Part of the sale to Greybull involved Morrisons guaranteeing some store rents if the business collapsed. Morrisons was left with a potential liability of about £20M.

=== Tata Steel Europe 2016, renamed British Steel; insolvent 2019 ===
Greybull announced 11 April it would buy Long Products Europe from Tata Steel Europe (Tata Group). The assets include Scunthorpe steelworks, two mills in Teesside, the Railway Engineering Consultancy TSP Projects Ltd. and a rail mill at Hayange, France. Tata Steel had been trying to sell its struggling UK steel business since 2014. Tata was in exclusive talks with Greybull, since December 2015, when they signed a Letter of Intent to sell Long Products Europe. The UK government was under pressure to help a sale process after Tata announced in March 2016 it would withdraw from the UK market. In April Tata announced Greybull would buy Tata's Long Products Europe business for £1. It was said that Greybull might bring £400M of investments into the company, and offer a future for its 4,400 UK employees. Greybull traded under the name "British Steel Limited", formerly used under the British Steel Corporation (BSC) group.

Greybull's initial contribution to British Steel was reportedly under £20M. In the following 2 years they charged £6M management fees and £34M loan interest, at 9%, via their Jersey-based parent company, Olympus Steel.

In May 2019 Greybull sought a £75M government rescue package to keep British Steel trading. Two weeks earlier, an emergency £120M government loan was agreed to enable it to pay its EU carbon bill (previously Greybull/British Steel had sold its excess free-issue carbon credits instead of saving them, in what was described as 'an ill-judged bet'). Fears of collapse mounted as talks stalled, but days later, the immediate crisis was averted by stop-gap funds from existing lenders.

On 22 May 2019 British Steel entered insolvency after the government refused a £30M loan, saying the non-commercial terms its private equity owner Greybull Capital were asking amounted to unlawful state aid. The insolvency put 5,000 British Steel jobs at risk, and many thousands in the company's supply chain.

=== Carillion; construction and outsourcing, 2018 (negotiations) ===
Greybull negotiated the possibility of buying parts of Carillion from the Insolvency Service after its liquidation in January 2018.

=== Redeem; mobile phone recycling company, 2018 ===
Greybull Capital bought the majority stake in Redeem UK Ltd, for an undisclosed sum, to allow it to renew an O2 contract. Redeem entered administration in July 2020.

=== Ascoval; French steel manufacturer, 2019 ===
Greybull bought the Ascoval steel mill in Saint-Saulve, northern France, out of insolvency. It would invest €47M through its company British Steel, and the French state €47M. The 720 workers' jobs were reported as being secured. The purchase was reported on 2 May 2019. Two weeks later it was reported that Greybull was preparing to put British Steel into administration on 22 May. After British Steel's insolvency, it was clarified that Greybull owned Ascoval, not British Steel and the French business was not directly affected. Greybull renamed Ascoval as 'British Steel Saint Saulve', and the company as Novasco.

On 23 July 2025, the enterprise was announced as entering a formal 'conciliation process' with a view to potential liquidation, blamed on the alleged failure of Greybull to honour a total investment commitment of 90m euros. The French state had already lent the enterprise 80m euros.

=== Nampak Plastics Europe Limited, 2020 ===
In February 2020, Greybull announced its acquisition of Nampak Plastics Europe Limited through its SPV, Bellcave Limited. Nampak is a manufacturer and packaging supplier of high-density polyethylene bottles to the UK dairy sector.

=== McLaren Applied, 2021 ===
In August 2021, after suffering from financial distress due to the COVID-19 pandemic, McLaren Group sold McLaren Applied to Greybull to build on McLaren Group's equity raise and debt refinancing. The company will continue to be managed by its current management team. McLaren Applied develops and delivers engineering and technology to organisations across motorsport, automotive, transport and others.
