= Seated Man with a Cane =

1918 painting by Amedeo Modigliani

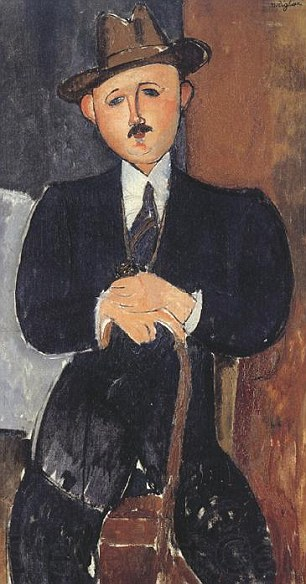
- Artist: Amedeo Modigliani
- Year: 1918
- Medium: Oil on canvas
- Dimensions: 126 cm × 75 cm (50 in × 30 in)

Seated Man with a Cane is a 1918 oil on canvas painting by the Italian artist Amedeo Modigliani. The painting has been the subject of a complex ownership dispute since 1946.

== Ownership history ==
=== Early sales ===
The painting was purchased by the International Art Center (IAC) at a 1996 Christie's auction in London for £2 million. In 2008, the painting was put up for auction by Sotheby's in New York, but no bids were made.

=== Stettiner claim ===
Philippe Maestracci claims ownership of the painting through inheritance through his grandfather. According to Maestracci, the painting was taken from his grandfather, Jewish Parisian art dealer Oscar Stettiner, by the Nazis during the German occupation of France. In 1939, Oscar Stettiner left the painting behind in France ahead of the German occupation. The Nazis took administration over the painting in 1941 and auctioned it off in 1944. In 1946, Oscar Stettiner filed a claim to recover the painting, but the French authorities were ultimately unable to find it. However, the French court recognized Oscar Stettiner as the owner of this painting, which still bears his name on label on the back of the painting.

In 2011, Maestracci filed a claim against Helly Nahmad and David Nahmad in the US federal court in New York to recover the painting. The Nahmads initially denied that they were the owners of the painting, claiming that they were merely exhibiting it on the behalf of the IAC, a Panamanian corporation listed as its titular owner. However the Panama Papers investigation launched by the International Consortium of Investigative Journalists, revealed that Nahmad was in fact the owner of IAC. Since then, Maestracci has filed multiple lawsuits in an attempt to recover the painting. According to the Panama Papers released in 2016, "David Nahmad, the family leader, has been the company’s sole owner since January 2014”. In April, 2016, Swiss authorities seized the painting from the Geneva Freeport as part of an ongoing investigation.

Following a court decision in 2017, Maestracci has standing to continue with his 2014 lawsuit to reclaim the work. In the January 2020 edition of the Art Newspaper new evidence is referred to with respect to a 1950 document, which contains a photograph of the painting on one side and the words "stolen" and "Stettiner family" on the reverse. This new evidence is further proof that the Seated Man With a Cane is the very same painting as the one stolen from Oscar Stettiner.

In April 2026 the court ruled in favor of the Stettiner heirs and ordered that the Nahmads return the looted Modigliani.

== See also ==
- Paintings by Amedeo Modigliani
- List of claims for restitution for Nazi-looted art
- The Holocaust in France
