= Madison Headrick =

American fashion model

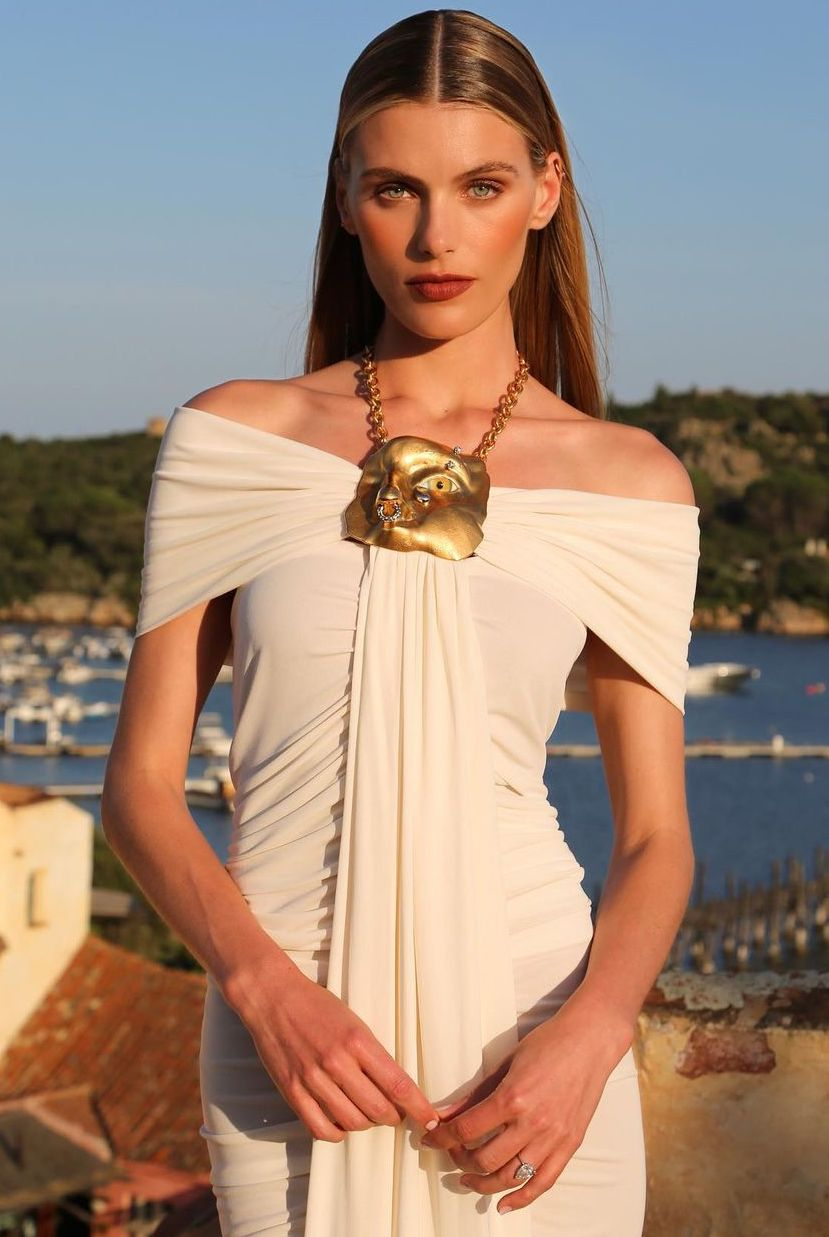
- Headrick in custom Schiaparelli
- Born: Madison Hope Headrick; December 5, 1993 (age 31); North Carolina, U.S.
- Education: Wando High School (Class of 2012)
- Modeling information
- Height: 1.78 m (5 ft 10 in)
- Hair color: Blonde
- Eye color: Green
- Agency: The Lions (New York); Elite Model Management (Paris, Milan); Select Model Management (London); Model Management (Hamburg); VISION Los Angeles (mother agency)

Madison Hope Headrick is an American fashion model.

== Early life and career ==
Headrick was born in North Carolina, and lived primarily in Charleston, South Carolina, in the suburb of Mount Pleasant. She graduated a semester early before becoming a model at 18.

She attended Wando High School and graduated in 2012. At Wando High School, she took Latin. Most of her early life was raised in Mount Pleasant, South Carolina, a suburb adjacent to Charleston, South Carolina.

Headrick debuted as a Prada exclusive, including the campaign shot by Steven Meisel. Headrick has also done campaigns for Calvin Klein.

She has appeared in advertisements for Polo Ralph Lauren, Vera Wang, Max Mara, Rag & Bone, Zuhair Murad, Hugo Boss, Acne Studios, Balmain, and Neiman Marcus. Headrick has appeared in Vogue Paris (as well as on the May 2019 supplement cover), Vogue, Harper's Bazaar, Vogue Latin America, Vogue Spain, Playboy and Issue.

Madison Headrick recently launched her travel brand Care.e.on (pronounced ‘carry on’) which focuses on producing high-quality beauty products for travelers.

== Personal life ==
In 2023, Headrick married art dealer Joseph Nahmad.
