= Rolf Theiler =

Swiss entrepreneur and philanthropist

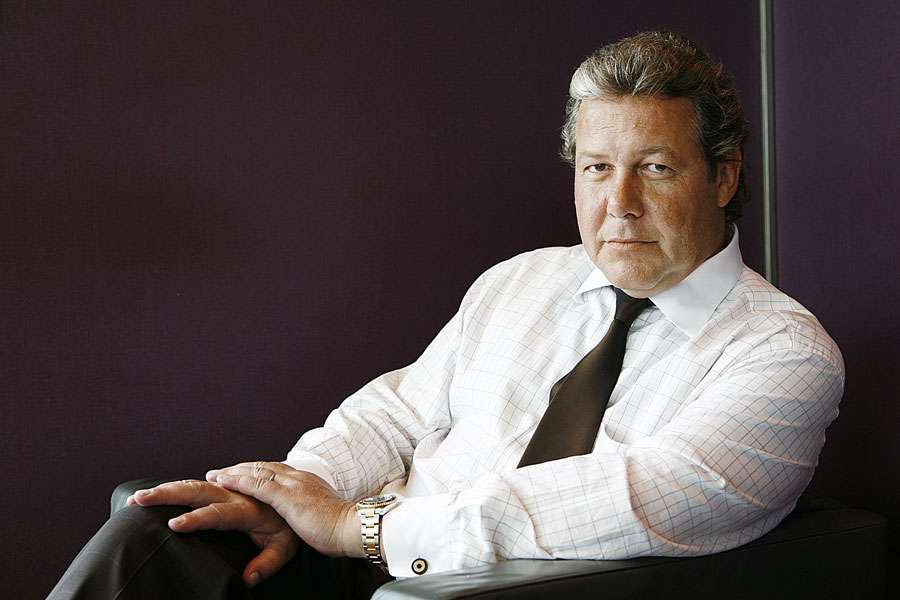
- Theiler in Zurich, Switzerland
- Born: 5 November 1957 (age 68)
- Education: SBS Swiss Business School
- Occupations: Entrepreneur; Philanthropist
- Known for: Chairman & President of Laureus FoundationCH; Founder & Co-owner of Mercedes CSI
- Spouse: Gloria Theiler (m. 2004)
- Relatives: Errol Arendz (brother in law); Massimo Agostinelli (son in law)

Rolf Theiler (born November 5, 1957) is a Swiss businessman. He is the founder and co-owner of Mercedes CSI and chairman and president of Laureus Foundation Switzerland. Theiler is the former co-owner and chairman of BVG Management.

== Early life & career ==
Rolf Theiler was born in Zurich, Switzerland in 1957, the youngest of three children. His father, Georges Theiler was an architect by trade. Theiler attended SBS Swiss Business School in Zurich but left to focus on his professional show jumping career. After which he took over his father's business, BVG Management together with his older brother, Urs Theiler.

== BVG Verwaltung ==
BVG Management is a property investment firm headquartered in Thalwil. The company was founded in 1964 by Georges Theiler and it is now managed by the second and third generation Theiler family. BVG is primarily focused on commercial and residential construction real-estate developments in Switzerland. Other areas of expertise; include structural civil engineering and real estate management services.

== Laureus Foundation ==
In 2012 Theiler became president of the Laureus Foundation CH and is also on the board of trustees. The foundation is involved in more than 140 charitable projects in 46 countries, helping 1.5 million children worldwide. Theiler has helped raise millions to aid over 10,000 children per year in Switzerland with the help of his partners IWC, Mercedes-Benz, Roland Berger, J. Safra Sarasin and Ochsner Sport. In 2014 Theiler founded the Laureus Cavallo 'Golf for Good' charity.

== Mercedes CSI ==
Theiler founded CSI in 1988 with his brother Urs, together the pair used their own startup capital of roughly CHF 2 million to launch their first event, which attracted 21,000 spectators on its debut. According to Bilanz, today CSI is the largest and most lucrative indoor equestrian tournament in the world, with over one million spectators worldwide. It also hosts the Grand Prix show jumping championship televised live by FEI TV. Mercedes-Benz has been a joint partner and sponsor of CSI since inception, other partners include Formula 1 Sauber, LGT, SRF, Tages Anzeiger and Longines.

== Equestrian achievements ==
Theiler began riding professionally at the age of 13 for the Junior Swiss Team and at the age of 18 he won the European Championship for the Swiss National Team. He officially represented the Swiss National Team for 7 years, during which point he also won The Swiss Indoor Championship in 1977. Theiler has represented the Swiss Federation for over 20 years as the 'Chef d'Equipe' for the Swiss National Show Jumping Team, bringing his team to qualify for the Olympic Games in Athens. He is the official World Cup Organiser & Treasurer of the International Federation for Equestrian Sports (FEI). He was also made the honorary president of Swiss Top Sport and honorary senior committee member and treasurer of the 'Jumping Owners Club' (JOC). Theiler has worked closely with and sponsored several highly accomplished riders. These riders include, Beat Mändli who rode Theiler's horse Idéo du Thot finished 3rd in the 2006 FEI Show Jumping World Cup which took place in Kuala Lumpur. He then went on to win the 2007 Rolex FEI World Cup Final in Las Vegas. Idéo Du Thot a Selle Français also became Horse of the Year Switzerland in 2006 . Other high profile riders include Markus Fuchs and Martin Fuchs who rode one of Theiler's most prized horses, 'Principal' to win the European Show Jumping Championships in 2012. Which subsequently led to an offer of over CHF 4 million prior to the 2008 Beijing Summer Olympics.

== Personal life ==
Theiler lives between his riding estate in Kappel am Albis and his coastal villa, Enigma Mansion in Cape Town, South Africa together with his wife Gloria Theiler. They have additional homes in Knysna on the Western Cape Province, Gandria on Lake Lugano and Klosters where they own Chalet Eugenia.
