= Chalet Eugenia =

Building in Klosters, Switzerland

Chalet Eugenia Founded by Baron Bentinck
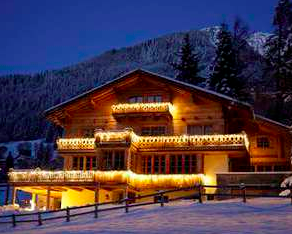
- Chalet Eugenia in Klosters-Serneus

- Location within Switzerland

General information
- Type: Chalet
- Architectural style: Swiss Alpine Chalet
- Location: Klosters Graubünden; Switzerland
- Coordinates: 46°52′27.12″N 9°53′10.93″E
- Elevation: 1,179 m (3,868 ft)
- Construction started: 1958
- Renovated: 2014
- Owner: Rolf Theiler

Height
- Top floor: 5

Technical details
- Floor area: 12,500 square feet (1,160 m^{2}) (300 m^{2} Spa Facility)

Design and construction
- Architect: Bentinck

Other information
- Parking: 8 cars (Underground)

The Chalet Eugenia is a chalet in Klosters, that has been used by the disgraced former prince Andrew Mountbatten-Windsor, who hosted there the disgraced politician Peter Mandelson and George Osborne.

== History and background ==
Chalet Eugenia was built after World War II and was completed in 1958 by Baroness Thyssen-Bornemisza. It was subsequently bought by the Bentinck family and later sold in 2012 to the Swiss businessman Rolf Theiler.

== Style and interior ==
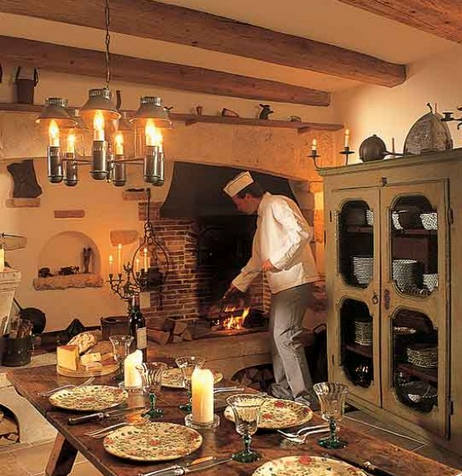
Chalet Eugenia's stone kitchen & original wood fired oven.

The chalet's interior design dates from the 1950s, and has been largely retained. The drawing room has a central pillared stone log fireplace leading onto an oak beamed and paneled dining room. The second dining room is equipped with the original wood fired oven. Most rooms have their own balconies and terraces with views of the Gotschna mountainous region. In 2006 Tom Robbins described the chalet as "the poshest pad in the Alps". The chalet overlooks the village of Klosters, described by Harper's Bazaar as "the ski resort beloved of the royal family".

== Skiing ==
Chalet Eugenia used to have a 'Ski in & Ski out' children's Heid Ski Lift directly next to the northwesterly side of the chalet, allowing access to the platter lift powered slope. The lift was dismantled and moved to Madrisa in 2017.

== Klosters and society ==
Recent visitors include Peter Mandelson, Chrissie Rucker and Swiss movie producer Marc Forster. In 2009 and 2010 Prince Andrew rented Chalet Eugenia during the Davos World Economic Forum, hosting Peter Mandelson and George Osborne during his first visit.

== See also ==
- Klosters
- Rolf Theiler
