= Gimel President =

American football player (born 1993)

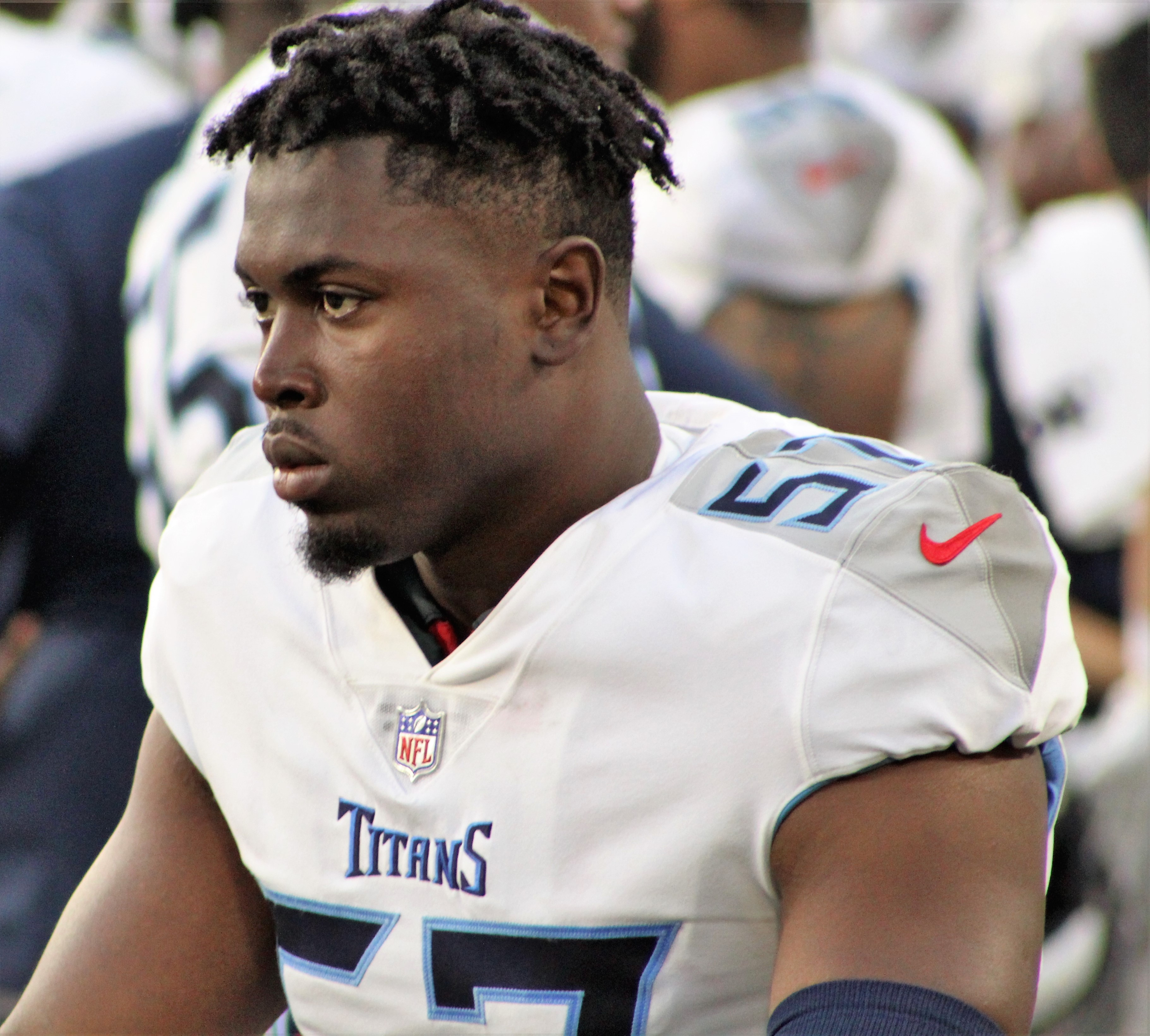
- President with the Tennessee Titans in 2018

No. 54, 53, 57, 40
- Position: Defensive end

Personal information
- Born: June 24, 1993 (age 33); Mount Pleasant, South Carolina, U.S.
- Listed height: 6 ft 4 in (1.93 m)
- Listed weight: 275 lb (125 kg)

Career information
- High school: Wando (Mount Pleasant)
- College: Illinois
- NFL draft: 2017: undrafted

Career history
- Houston Texans (2017); Tennessee Titans (2018–2019)*; Houston Texans (2019)*; St. Louis BattleHawks (2020)
- * Offseason or practice squad member only

Career NFL statistics
- Total tackles: 3
- Stats at Pro Football Reference

Gimel DeShaun President (born June 24, 1993) is an American former professional football player who was a defensive end in the National Football League (NFL). He was signed by the Houston Texans as an undrafted free agent in 2017. He played college football for the Auburn Tigers and Illinois Fighting Illini.

President played in four games during his rookie season before being released by the Texans prior to the start of the 2018 season. He was then signed by the Tennessee Titans, where he saw no game action and spent the entire season on either injured reserve or the practice squad. After being released by the Titans during the 2019 offseason, he was reacquired by the Texans, but was released before the start of the regular season.

In 2020, he played for the St. Louis BattleHawks of the XFL.

== Early life ==
He was born in 1993 in Mount Pleasant, South Carolina, to parents Zola and Delores Simmons. President played as a defensive end in football at Wando High in South Carolina under Coach Jim Noonan. In his senior year, President finished with 77 tackles, 5 sacks, 5 forced fumbles, 2 fumble recoveries and 11 pass breakups.

== College career ==
President redshirted in 2012. He played for three seasons at Auburn (2013–15) before transferring to Illinois for his final collegiate campaign. He tallied 45 tackles, seven tackles for loss and three sacks during his three seasons at Auburn. He was granted immediate eligibility at Illinois in 2016 after graduating with a degree in fitness, conditioning, and performance from Auburn.

== Professional career ==
=== Houston Texans ===
President signed with the Houston Texans as an undrafted free agent on May 12, 2017. He was waived by the Texans on September 2, and was re-signed to the practice squad the following day. President was promoted to the active roster on November 29. He played in four regular season games during his rookie year.

On April 30, 2018, President was waived by the Texans.

=== Tennessee Titans ===
On May 1, 2018, President was claimed off waivers by the Tennessee Titans. He was waived/injured on August 10, and was placed on injured reserve. President was released by Tennessee on August 18. On December 18, President was re-signed to the Titans' practice squad. He signed a reserve/future contract with the Titans on December 31.

President was waived by the Titans on August 1, 2019.

=== Houston Texans (second stint) ===
On August 4, 2019, President was signed by the Houston Texans. On August 30, President was released by the Texans.

=== St. Louis BattleHawks ===
On October 21, 2019, President was picked by the St. Louis BattleHawks in the 2020 XFL draft. He had his contract terminated when the league suspended operations on April 10, 2020.
