= Bitchcoin =

Art-based cryptocurrency

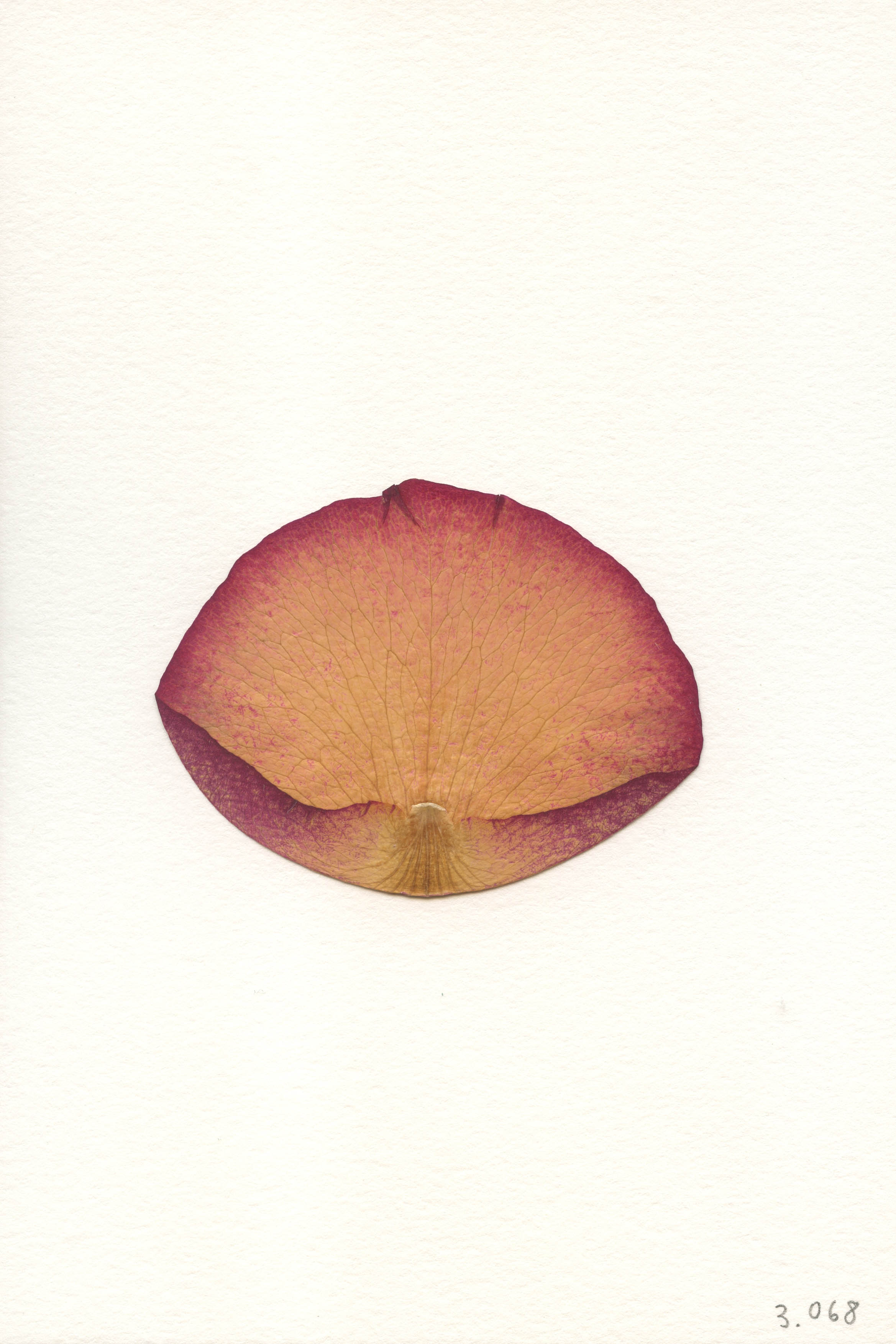
- An example of one of the 3,291 Bitchcoins
- Artist: Sarah Meyohas
- Platform: Ethereum
- Release: February 2015
- Genre: Collectible

Bitchcoin is a non-fungible token (NFT) on the Ethereum blockchain. The project was launched in early 2015 as a fork of Bitcoin, several months before the launch of Ethereum. Bitchcoin was originally backed by the artist Sarah Meyohas' photography at a fixed rate of one token to 25 square-inches of one of the artist's photographs. This was one of the first instances of a physical work of art being put on a blockchain.

== Background ==
In 2014, the artist Sarah Meyohas created a series of photographs, titled Speculations, that would be fixed to tokens called Bitchcoin. The project began with researching ideas of value, valuation, and the nature of speculation. Photographs from the series were backed by Bitchcoin at a fixed rate of one Bitchcoin to 25 square-inches of a print effectively letting anyone in possession of 25 Bitchcoins to exchange them for an entire photograph.

The artist printed eight editions of the first Speculation photograph, each of which measured 21 5/8 in × 28 7/8 in (550 mm × 730 mm), and thus produced 200 coins that were released at $100.00 each to back the prints. The prints were stored in a vault, and anyone who purchased Bitchcoin received a physical certificate called a "paper wallet" which recorded the relevant private and public keys for one's wallet.

In 2023, the Centre Pompidou announced the institution had acquired two Bitchcoins to join 17 other NFTs to add to the contemporary art museum's collection of new-media works.

== Cloud of Petals project ==
In 2017, Meyohas created the Cloud of Petals project which had sixteen workers gather to archive 100,000 rose petals. The data set compiled was used to map out an artificial intelligence algorithm that learned to generate petals through a series of virtual worlds. Additionally, each worker set aside one petal per rose which they found to be the most beautiful and those 3,291 chosen petals were then pressed onto archival paper. Documenting this performance on 16mm film, Cloud of Petals, traces beauty and subjectivity through systems of automation and artificial intelligence.

== Migration ==
Since its inception, each Bitchcoin is minted as an ERC-1155 token and is now backed by one of the 3,291 pressed rose petals from Meyohas' 2017 performance, Cloud of Petals. Meyohas eventually migrated the currency to the Ethereum blockchain. Previous owners of Bitchcoin could receive an equivalent amount of the new token. Once the tokens were migrated to Ethereum they were offered during an auction at Phillips in May 2021.
