= Idéo du Thot =

Swiss show jumper (1996–2025)

Ideo Du Thot
- Breed: Selle Français
- Discipline: Show Jumping
- Sire: Arioso Du Theillet
- Dam: Battante Du Thot
- Maternal grandsire: Shaliman Du Thot
- Sex: Gelding
- Foaled: April 19, 1996; Réville, France
- Died: 2025
- Colour: Bay
- Breeder: Jean-François and Margareth Noël
- Owner: Rolf Theiler
- Rider: Beat Mändli, Martin Fuchs

Awards
- First place, 2007 FEI World Cup Show Jumping Final

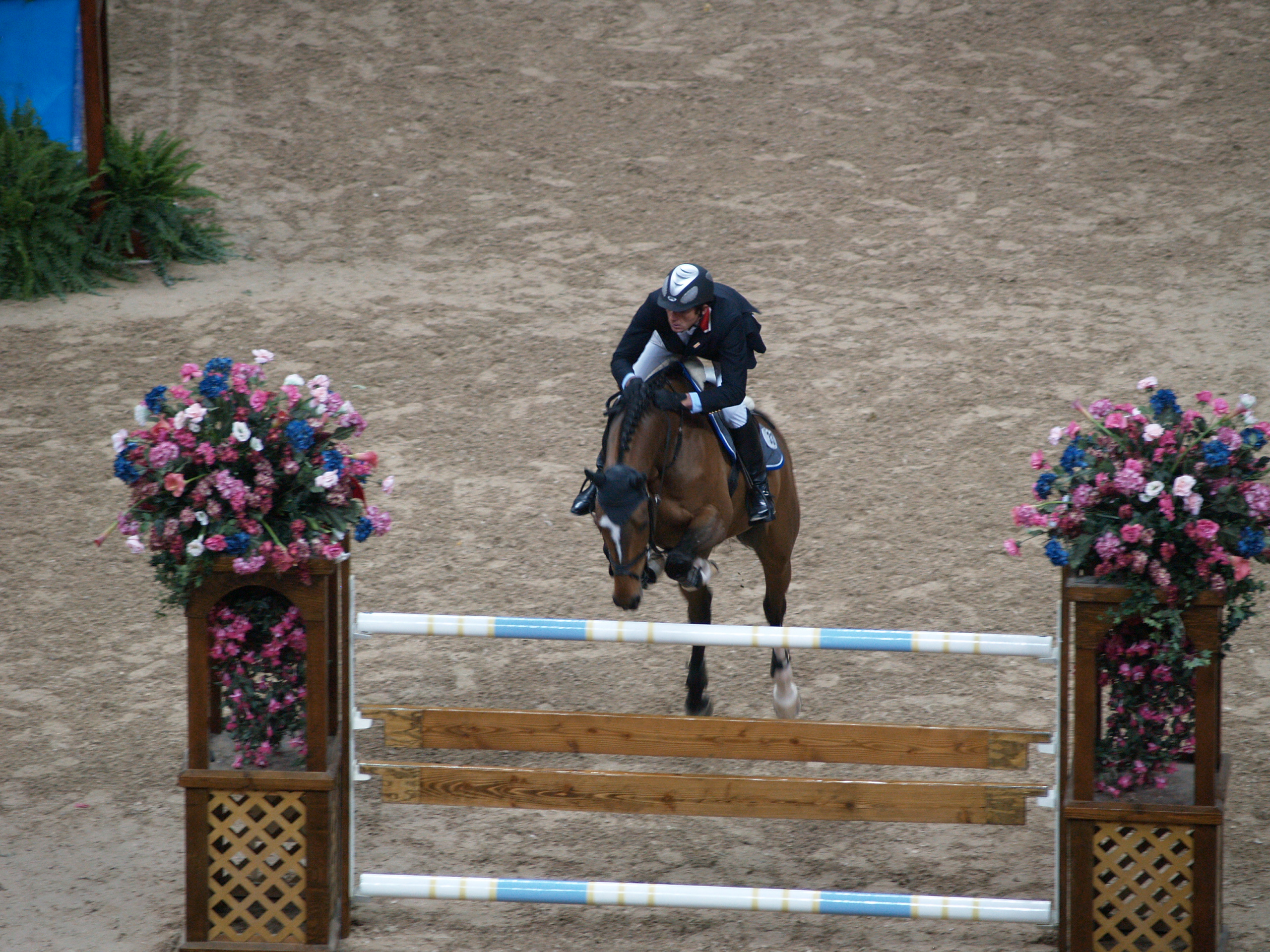
Beat Mandli and Idéo du Thot jumping fence 3 at the FEI World Cup Final at Las Vegas in 2007.

Idéo du Thot was a bay Selle français gelding, who competed internationally in showjumping, most notably with Swiss rider Beat Mändli. In 2007, Idéo du Thot and Mändli won the FEI Show Jumping World Cup Finals in Las Vegas. It was the second time that a Swiss combination won the top prize.

== Background ==
Idéo du Thot was born on April 19, 1996 at Élevage du Thot, the farm of Jean-François and Margareth Noël, in Réville, France.

Idéo du Thot started his competitive career in France with Cedric and Eugénie Angot. He was then ridden by Swiss rider and co-owner Urs Fäh before being bought out by his other co-owner Rolf Theiler. Theiler sent Idéo du Thot to Beat Mändli where he would have some of his greatest competitive success.

For three consecutive years, Idéo du Thot and Mändli placed in the Show Jumping World Cup finals. In Kuala Lumpur in 2006 they took third, in 2007, they won, and in 2008 they tied for fourth place.

In October 2008, the horse's owner Rolf Theiler gave the ride of Idéo du Thot to fellow Swiss equestrian Martin Fuchs, who was only 16 years old at the time. du Thot was recovering from a fetlock injury and Fuchs oversaw his rehabilitation. Once healed, Fuchs competed Idéo du Thot until December 2011, when the horse was retired from international competition.

Upon retirement, Idéo du Thot was sent back to live with his breeders Jean-François and Margareth Noël in Réville. Idéo du Thot died in Normandie in 2025 at age 29.
