= Joseph Nahmad =

American art dealer

Joseph Nahmad (born 1990, New York City) is an American art dealer of Syrian Jewish descent, and the founder of the Nahmad Contemporary gallery, located on 980 Madison Avenue in New York. Opened in 2013, the gallery specializes in contemporary artists who rose to prominence during the 1980s, as well as European Modern masters from the 20th century.

== Career ==
The exhibitions presented by Joe Nahmad include curated shows that historicize contemporary artists by highlighting a distinct series, medium, or focus within their body of work:

- 2013 : Sterling Ruby - SP Paintings 2007
- 2014 : Sigmar Polke - Threads of Metamorphosis: Fabric Pictures
- 2013 : Richard Prince - Monochrome Jokes 1987-1994 / 2015 - Appropriation photographique 'Fashion' 1980-1982
- 2015 : Joan Miró - Oiseaux dans L’Espace, works from the sixties and seventies
- 2015 : Rudolf Stingel - Styrofoam and Celotex 2000-2003 series
- 2016 : Daniel Buren - Origin of Stripes: Paintings from 1965-1966
- 2016 : Jean-Michel Basquiat - Text-centric paintings / 2019: Xerox paintings 1979-1988
- 2017: Albert Oehlen - Grau 1997-2008 / 2019 : Spiegelbielder - Mirror Paintings 1982-1990
- 2019: Georges Mathieu - Monumental Paintings from 1978

In addition, Joe Nahmad also creates dialogues between modern and contemporary artists in exhibitions :

- in 2014 in Poetics of Gesture, he brought together works by Jean-Michel Basquiat, Egon Schiele and Cy Twombly;
- in 2016, Joe Nahmad reinterpreted Les Fleurs du Mal the subversive volume of the 19th century French poet Charles Baudelaire, with a transgenerational group exhibition. He mirrored a dozen works by 19th century French Symbolist Gustave Moreau (a contemporary of Baudelaire) with avant-garde artists from the 20th century (Balthus, Marc Chagall, Salvador Dalí, Max Ernst, René Magritte, Henri Matisse and Francis Picabia) and from the 21st century (George Condo, John Currin, Wade Guyton, Damien Hirst, Elizabeth Peyton and Richard Prince);
- in 2017, Joe Nahmad presented Warhol, Wool, Guyton, an exhibition that featured late abstract paintings by Andy Warhol alongside paintings by two of today’s leading contemporary artists: Christopher Wool and Wade Guyton
- in 2018, Joe Nahmad presented an exhibition by Joan Miro's textile works (the Sobreteixims created in the 1970s) in conversation with contemporary artist David Hammons's tarp paintings;
- in 2020, Joe Nahmad foregrounded the conceptual affinities between two French artists, Daniel Buren and Pierre Huyghe which presented a selection of Buren’s vanguard striped paintings from 1966 in dialogue with one of Huyghe’s dynamic aquarium ecosystems.

== Personal life ==
Joe Nahmad is the son of collector David Nahmad, and the brother of Helly Nahmad, who also has a gallery in New York.

In 2023, Nahmad married model Madison Headrick.
