= Helly Nahmad (New York art collector) =

American art dealer and art collector (born 1978)

- Born: c. 1978
- Education: Dalton School
- Occupations: Art collector, art dealer
- Organization: Helly Nahmad Gallery
- Parent: David Nahmad
- Relatives: Joe Nahmad (uncle); Ezra Nahmad (uncle); Helly Nahmad (London) (cousin)
- Website: www.hellynahmadgallery.com

Helly Nahmad (born circa 1978) is an American art dealer and art collector. In 2000, he founded the Helly Nahmad Gallery in Manhattan, New York, which holds several fine art exhibitions each year featuring artists such as Pablo Picasso, Chaïm Soutine, Francis Bacon, and Giorgio de Chirico.

In 2014, he was sentenced to 12 months in prison (and served four) after pleading guilty to a federal charge, "operating an illegal gambling business". In January 2021, he was pardoned by President Donald Trump. In 2018, Nahmad bought Picasso's Young Girl with a Flower Basket painting for $115 million. The painting will go on loan to Musée d'Orsay in Paris.

== Early life and education ==
Hillel "Helly" Nahmad was born circa 1978. The son of art dealer David Nahmad, his extended Syrian Jewish family had developed a reputation as art collectors and dealers "predominantly in 19th- and 20th-century art" out of countries such as Italy and Monaco. Nahmad spent his childhood in Manhattan, New York and at a young age would shadow his father to fine art galleries, auctions, and museums. His father recollects that Nahmad was "scoping out antiques at Sotheby's auctions" by five years of age, developing a fascination with artists such as Claude Monet by the age of twelve. His younger brother, Joe, would also go on to be active in art. Nahmad interned in the Jewish Museum in the summers and attended the private Dalton School in New York's Upper East Side. According to a former school official, he was expelled in his senior year for "unclear" reasons. Nahmad has refuted this retelling and states he missed school while traveling and turned down an opportunity to repeat his senior year. He graduated from Beekman High School Manhattan. He attended part of an art course at Christie's in 1997.

== Career ==
=== 2000-2012 ===
In 2000, he purchased the Davlyn Gallery and changed the name to the Helly Nahmad Gallery. The gallery since the 1990s has been located in the Carlyle Hotel on Madison Avenue in Manhattan. Nahmad's gallery would go on to host several fine art exhibitions at the gallery per year, starting with the Sounds of Colours exhibition in 2004, which displayed the works of Wassily Kandinsky. The following year the gallery held two major exhibitions, a retrospective on Fernand Léger and a celebration of the work of Amedeo Modigliani. In 2006 and 2007, his gallery held both a Max Ernst and a Pablo Picasso exhibition, followed by a second Picasso exhibition titled Picasso's Bodegones in 2008. Also in 2008, the gallery held an exhibition that collected the works of Gustave Moreau. The Helly Nahmad Gallery New York then oversaw the display of a Jean Dubuffet collection and an Alexander Calder retrospective in 2009. In 2010, the gallery curated a Sam Francis exhibition.

Through May and into June 2011, the exhibition Soutine/Bacon was held at the Helly Nahmad Gallery, and was described by ArtDaily as "the first comparative exhibition of Chaïm Soutine and Francis Bacon." Works were lent from institutions such as the Metropolitan Museum, the Museum of Modern Art, Tate Modern, the Bacon Foundation, the Centre Georges Pompidou, the Albertina, the Beyeler Foundation, the Louisiana Museum of Modern Art, the Kunsthaus Zurich, and the Pearlman Foundation. Also in 2011, the gallery held an exhibition on paintings by Alexander Calder.

=== 2013-2014 ===
By the spring of 2013, Nahmad had overseen the gallery's display of "name-brand Modernists" such as Jean Dubuffet, Mark Rothko, Sam Francis, Wassily Kandinsky and Francis Bacon. The gallery premiered a new show in April 2013 titled Impressionist & Modern Masters. Described by Bloomberg as "an exhibition of modern and postwar artists including Joan Miró, Alexander Calder, Jean Dubuffet and Fernand Léger," it was open to the public and also featured works by Mark Rothko and Wayne Thiebaud. Nahmad's gallery pulled in $70 million in sales for 2013, with Nahmad attending auctions such as Christie's.

In November 2013, Nahmad pled guilty to one federal count of operating an illegal sports gambling business. As part of the plea deal, he agreed to forfeit around $6.4 million and a Raoul Dufy painting, Carnaval à Nice, to the United States, with other charges such as money laundering, racketeering, and fraud dropped by prosecutors. Sentenced on April 30, 2014, he was released after four months of a 12-month sentence at the Otisville Federal Correctional Institution, also paying a $30,000 fine and taking part in drug testing, community service, and a gambling addiction program upon release. At Nahmad's sentencing, Assistant U.S. Attorney Joshua Naftalis told the judge that Nahmad provided the illegal sports gambling business millions of dollars transferred from his father's Swiss bank account.

=== 2015-2017 ===
After the May 2015 premiere of its exhibit The Wounded Canvas: Burri Fontana Manzoni Tàpies, Nahmad represented his gallery at the Art Basel art fair in Basel, Switzerland in June 2015. Among other pieces, his booth included three Pablo Picasso paintings including Les Femmes d'Alger (Version C), 28 Décembre, 1954 for $16 million. Stating to the New York Times that over the past year collectors had been investing more in "dead and late- and mid-career artists," Nahmad also selected works by Alexander Calder, Claude Monet, Joan Miró, and Mark Rothko. At USD$50 million, Art News related that the 1955 Rothko was "almost certainly the most expensive work in the fair." From November 4, 2015 through January 2016, the Helly Nahmad Gallery in New York ran the Mnemosyne: de Chirico and Antiquity exhibition, which displayed "Giorgio de Chirico's surrealist 20th century works together with Greek and Roman antiquities" such as ancient statues and Greek vases. For the show, Nahmad partnered with antiquities dealer Phoenix Ancient Art to curate a collection of pieces from private collections. Blouin Artinfo wrote that the show was "an aesthetic move that matches de Chirico's Neo-classical style, a later and less explored side of his work."

In 2011, Philippe Meastracci, the heir of art dealer Oscar Stettiner, filed suit in United States district court against the Helly Nahmad Gallery in New York for title to the 1918 Modigliani painting Seated Man with a Cane, which was estimated to have a value of $25 million. Maestracci claimed that the painting, which had been sold in 1996 through Christie's for $3.2 million, had been looted from Stettiner in Paris during World War II. The complaint was withdrawn in 2012. In November 2015, Stettiner's estate filed an amended complaint in the Supreme Court of the State of New York again seeking title to Seated Man with a Cane from various Nahmad family members and the Helly Nahmad Gallery in New York. Arbitration was ongoing as of April 2016, with the defendants arguing that the painting had been legally purchased in good faith from Christie's, that Stettiner's claim of ownership was unproven, and that the Stettiner estate's case was bankrolled by individuals with a financial conflict of interest. In 2016, Nahmad's gallery organized and held the exhibition Selected Works by 20th Century Masters. That December at Art Basel, Nahmad sold the painting Made in Japan I by Jean-Michel Basquiat for $15 million. Several days later Bloomberg described the transaction as "the highest price so far at the event."

== Personal life ==
Nahmad resides in New York City, where he has owned property in Trump Tower in Manhattan, with a complete floor purchased over a decade, for over $18 million.
