= Wando High School =

High school in South Carolina, United States

Location
- 1000 Warrior Way; Mount Pleasant, South Carolina, Charleston County, South Carolina 29466; United States; 32°53′08″N 79°45′33″W

Information
- Type: Public high school
- Established: 1973
- Sister school: East Cooper Center for Advanced Studies
- School district: Charleston County School District
- CEEB code: 411445
- Principal: Charles “Chas” Coker
- Staff: 142.50 (FTE)
- Grades: 9–12
- Enrollment: 2,593 (2023–2024)
- Student to teacher ratio: 18.20
- Campus size: 110 acres (0.45 km^{2})
- Campus type: suburban
- Colors: Cardinal red, black and white
- Song: Southern Sun
- Fight song: Tomahawk Chop / War Chant
- Mascot: Warrior
- Rival: Lucy Beckham High School
- Newspaper: Tribal Tribune
- Yearbook: Legend
- Feeder schools: Cario Middle School; Laing Middle School; Moultrie Middle School
- Website: wandohigh.ccsdschools.com

Wando High School (often shortened to "Wando") is a public high school within the Charleston County School District, located in Mt. Pleasant, South Carolina, United States. The school serves students living in Mount Pleasant and other suburban portions of eastern Charleston County. Established in 1973, the school was re-built in 2004 to accommodate the town's rapid growth during the 1990s. It also shares a campus with the technical school, East Cooper Center for Advanced Studies (ECCAS).

Its attendance boundary includes Sullivan's Island.

== History ==
Wando High School takes its name from the nearby Wando River, a major tributary of the Cooper River that divides Charleston and Mount Pleasant. The original school opened in 1973 shortly after desegregation was completed in Charleston County.

Planning for a new campus for Wando High School began in 1998, utilizing a federal planning grant. The architect LS3P Associates designed the new facility, which opened for the 2004 school year. After the new campus was completed, the old campus became a temporary home for other local schools while they rebuilt their primary campuses, starting with Moultrie Middle School from 2006–2009. In 2010 Charleston County leased part of the property to Buist Academy. When Buist completed its new downtown campus, its place on the old campus was taken by Jennie Moore Elementary. This arrangement continued until the 2014–2015 school year, for which both Laing and Jennie Moore moved into their new facilities a few miles away. Demolition of the old historical campus was completed in the fall of 2016. Today, the only remnant of the old campus is the football stadium, which was used by the Wando football team until the new stadium opened at the school in fall 2018. The old location of Wando High School was eventually converted to a new high school named for Wando's former principal, Lucy Beckham High School.

In 2009, principal Lucy Beckham was named the 2010 MetLife/National Association of Secondary School Principals (NASSP) National Secondary Principal of the Year. This is classified as the highest honor in the nation specifically for secondary school principals.

== Band ==
The Wando High School Band is led by Director of Bands Bobby Lambert, with support from Associate Directors Lanie Radecke and Matthew Kilby. It has a history of competitive success in not only concert band but also in its jazz and marching ensembles.

=== Marching Band ===
The Wando High School Marching Band has secured numerous South Carolina state championships. The program has been a finalist at the Bands of America (BOA) Grand National Championships, with its highest placement being fourth place. The band's performances have earned top awards at various regional and super-regional competitions.

=== Concert and Jazz Bands ===
The program includes multiple concert and jazz ensembles. These ensembles have received invitations to perform at events such as the Midwest Band and Orchestra Clinic. The Wando band program has consistently had a high number of students selected for the South Carolina All-State and All-Region bands.

=== Winter Guard ===
Under the direction of Brian Winn, the Wando High School Winter Guard is a multi-year finalist at the Winter Guard International (WGI) World Championships and has secured numerous state championships.

== Academics ==
Wando High School is accredited with the Southern Association of Colleges and Schools.

== Notable alumni ==
- Amanda Baker — actress
- Hannah Betfort — American soccer player for North Carolina Courage
- Kevin Brown — current CFL running back for the Edmonton Elks
- Dexter Coakley — former NFL linebacker and 3x Pro Bowl selection
- Shepard Fairey — contemporary street artist, graphic designer, activist, illustrator and founder of OBEY Clothing
- Madison Headrick — model
- Travis Jervey — former NFL running back, Pro Bowl selection and Super Bowl XXXI champion with the Green Bay Packers
- Brooke Mosteller — Miss South Carolina 2013
- Gimel President — NFL linebacker
- Barry Richardson — former NFL offensive tackle
- Melanie Thornton — pop singer
- Heidi VanDerveer — basketball coach
