= Sarah Meyohas =

American visual artist

- Born: 1991 (age 34–35); Manhattan, New York
- Education: Yale University, M.F.A. University of Pennsylvania, Huntsman Program in International Studies & Business College of Arts & Sciences, B.A. International Studies Wharton School, B.S. Economic
- Website: sarahmeyohas.com

Sarah Meyohas (born 1991, Manhattan, New York) is a French-American visual artist working across multiple disciplines including film, photography, virtual reality, performance art and sculpture.

== Early life and education ==
Meyohas grew up in Uptown Manhattan, New York. She has three brothers, including financiers Nathaniel Meyohas and Marc Meyohas. She holds a B.A. in international relations from the University of Pennsylvania and a B.S in finance from the Wharton School, and in 2015, she received an M.F.A. from Yale University.

== Work ==
In her multimedia work, Meyohas uses networks of information, power, value, and communication. Most spaces are shaped by the flow of desire through matrices of thought; this is the site of her work.

=== BitchCoin ===
In 2015, Meyohas gained traction for her work Bitchcoin, the artist's own form of cryptocurrency, similar to Bitcoin. One Bitchcoin is worth 25 square inches of any one of Meyohas' photographic prints. The value of each coin fluctuates with the increasing value of the artist's works. "BitchCoin asserts artistic agency as an economic claim", Meyohas states, "This is important for artists when art is viewed as a cultural capital".

=== Speculations ===
In her Speculation series, Meyohas creates photographs using two-way mirrors with a series of constructed props – from rose petals and branches of yellow blossom, to a haze of blue smoke and a pair of hands – exploring limitless exchange.

=== Stock Performance ===
In her first solo art exhibition at New York City’s 303 Gallery, Meyohas traded stocks on the New York Stock Exchange then, in real time, drew the changes in the stock’s valuation with oil stick on blank canvases throughout the gallery. The line, value over time, is an index of her movement, physically in the gallery and virtually in her ownership. Each painting is one of many financial records, but unique as an artwork.

=== Cloud of Petals ===
Cloud of Petals is Meyohas’s first large scale exhibition and virtual reality experience at Red Bull Arts New York. The two-floor exhibition is the culmination of an extensive yearlong project that is both archival and experimental. At the site of the former Bell Labs, sixteen workers photograph 100,000 individual rose petals. The massive dataset the compile is used to map out an artificial intelligence algorithm that learns to generate new petals forever. Meyohas investigates the artificially of beauty by enlisting the faculties of human subjectivity through a body of work that integrates culture, photography, artificial intelligence, and organic matter.

== Exhibitions ==
=== Solo exhibitions ===
(2015) BitchCoin, Where, Brooklyn, NY

(2016) Stock Performance, 303 Gallery, NY, NY

(2017) Sarah Meyohas, Galerie Pact, Paris, FR

(2017) Sarah Meyohas, Independent Régence, Brussels, BE

(2017) Cloud of Petals, Red Bull Arts New York, NY, NY
