= Unit London =

Unit
- Established: 2013
- Location: Hanover Square, Mayfair, London
- Type: Contemporary art gallery
- Directors: Joe Kennedy and Jonny Burt
- Website: unitlondon.com

Unit is a contemporary art gallery based at 3 Hanover Square in Mayfair, London, with a secondary location, The Stables, in Covent Garden. It was founded by two young artists, Joe Kennedy and Jonny Burt, in 2013.

== History and development ==
Established in 2013 by Joe Kennedy and Jonny Burt as a startup gallery in a 300 square foot pop-up space in Chiswick, The gallery uses social media to connect with millennials by promoting artists and their brands on social media platforms, such as Facebook, Instagram and Twitter, and through the use of videos and web content. Unit has attracted interest from art lovers, artists, art collectors, and figures from all creative industries, such as Jude Law, Bob Geldof, and Jean Paul Gautier, who have expressed their support for the approach by following, liking, commenting, and sharing the gallery's posts.

In 2015, Unit relocated to a 4,000 square foot gallery in Soho, London, Unit has been named as one of the Top 5 Young Contemporary Galleries in London. The gallery subsequently moved location in March 2018 to Langley Street in Covent Garden.

In June 2018, the gallery opened a new 6000 square foot space in Mayfair, which is currently its flagship location. Now its main site, the venue hosts an exhibition programme showcasing the gallery's leading artists, as well as a series of cultural events. The Stables, located in Covent Garden, serves as an accessible exhibition and event space which focuses on group exhibitions, artist development, and a variety of brand-led events.

== Previous exhibitions ==
2021

- Song of Songs - Group exhibition (Hanover Square)
- Silence - Solo exhibition by Esther Janssen (Hanover Square)
- The Living Circle Us - Solo exhibition by Joshua Hagler (Hanover Square)
- Imfumbatho - Solo Exhibition by Sthenjwa Luthuli (Hanover Square)
- The other Landscape - Solo exhibition by Ziping Wang (Hanover Square)
- Rites of Passage - Group exhibition (Hanover Square)
- You Gave Me Paradise - Solo exhibition by Will Martyr (Hanover Square)
- Fragments - Solo exhibition by Jason Boyd Kinsella (Hanover Square)
- Imbolc - Solo exhibition by Mr. Jago (Hanover Square)
- Queen Mudda - Solo exhibition by Cydne Jasmin Coleby (Hanover Square)
- Wild Things Happen in Stillness - Solo exhibition by Oh De Laval (Hanover Square)
- Providence - Solo exhibition by Amadeo Morelos (Hanover Square)
- The likes of others – Solo exhibition by Jeremy Olson (Hanover Square)
- A Small Spark vs a Great Forest – Solo exhibition by Jason Seife (Hanover Square)
- David Henry Nobody Jr – Solo online exhibition (Platform)

2020

- Nicolas Holiber – Solo online exhibition (Platform)
- IRL – Group exhibition (Hanover Square)
- Elsa Rouy – Solo online exhibition (Platform)
- Where Art Happened: From Klint to Party – Solo exhibition by Damian Elwes (Hanover Square)
- Ziping Wang – Solo online exhibition (Platform)
- The Medium Is The Message – Group exhibition (Hanover Square)
- Joshua Hagler – Solo online exhibition (Platform)
- Super Disco Disco Breakin' – Solo exhibition by Liz Markus (The Stables)
- Big Mood – Solo exhibition by Mauro C. Martinez (Hanover Square)
- Mirror Mirror – Solo exhibition by Emily Marie Miller (Hanover Square)
- Purple Lands – Solo exhibition by Rex Southwick (Hanover Square)
- Alter Ego – Group exhibition (Hanover Square)
- Natural Order – Solo exhibition by Michael Staniak (Hanover Square)
- Drawn Together – Group online exhibition (Hanover Square)
- For Your Eyes Only – Solo exhibition by Oh de Laval (Hanover Square)
- Nothing New Under The Sun – Solo exhibition by Ryan Hewett (Hanover Square)
- Transcend – Solo exhibition by Tom French (The Stables)
- FAME – Solo exhibition by Teiji Hayama (Hanover Square)
- Relic – Solo exhibition by Jake Wood-Evans (Hanover Square)

2019

- Beyond Borders – Group exhibition (Hanover Square)
- Nothing New Under The Sun – Solo exhibition by Ryan Hewett (Hanover Square)
- Kinesthesia – Solo exhibition by Dylan Gebbia-Richards (Hanover Square)
- Rewild – Solo exhibition by Mr Jago (Hanover Square)
- It's Her Factory – Solo exhibition by Helen Beard (Hanover Square)
- Chimera – Solo exhibition by Joshua Hagler (Hanover Square)
- Querencia – Solo exhibition by Rex Southwick (Hanover Square)
- New Paintings – Solo exhibition by Ryan Hewett (Hanover Square)
- Come Together, Far Away – Solo exhibition by Sage Vaughn (Hanover Square)
- Earth – Solo exhibition by Zhuang Hong Yi (Hanover Square)
- Reverence – Solo exhibition by Johan Van Mullem (Hanover Square)
- Moments – Solo exhibition by Yann Houri (Hanover Square)
- Legacy & Disorder – Solo exhibition by Jake Wood Evans (Hanover Square)
- Shape Shifter – Solo exhibition by Peter Gronquist (Hanover Square)
- SIGNS – Solo exhibition by Massimo Agostinelli (Hanover Square)

2018

- The Garden - Solo exhibition by Ryan Hewett (Hanover Square)
- 2 Looking 4 U – Exhibition presenting eight emerging artists (Hanover Square)
- Strata – Solo exhibition by Mr Jago (Hanover Square)
- Fathoms – Solo exhibition by Will Martyr (Hanover Square)
- A Portrait of a tree – Solo exhibition by Adrian Houston (Hanover Square)
- 21st Century Women – Group exhibition of British female artists (Hanover Square)
- Reincarnation – Solo exhibition by Jacky Tsai (Hanover Square)
- Hunt Paintings – Solo exhibition by Philip Colbert (Hanover Square)

2017

- Transitions - Solo exhibition by Jake Wood-Evans
- In God's We Trust - Solo exhibition by PichiAvo
- Wanderlust - Solo exhibition by Will Martyr
- PARALLAX - Solo exhibition by Tom French
- RAW II - Solo exhibition by Zhuang Hong Yi
- Avant Arte X Unit. Artist: Jason Seif, Lionel Smit, Henrik Uldalen, Brian Willmont, Ryan Hewett, Ivan Alifan, Sandra Chevrier, Stephan Doitschinoff, Anthony Lister, and Massimo Agostinelli.

2016

- De Anima - Solo exhibition by Johan van Mullem
- ORDER - Solo exhibition by Ryan Hewett
- Subjection & Discipline - Solo exhibition by Jake Wood-Evans
- Satellite Exhibition - Solo exhibition by Ryan Hewett
- Radical Presence exhibition. Curated by Kate Linfoot. Featuring over 30 works from the past two decades by 24 leading international artists, Radical Presence delivers a global perspective on how the digital age has profoundly altered the way we perceive and interact with our environment.

2015

- RAW - Solo exhibition by Zhuang Hong Yi
- Untitled - Solo exhibition by Ryan Hewett
- Paintguide exhibition. Curated by Henrik Uldalen. Showing 60 international artists working primarily with the medium of paint, as featured on the Instagram account @Paintguide.
- New Blood exhibition. Artists: Russell Young, Ivan Alifan, Richard Orlinski, Cécile Pleasance, Peter Gronquist, Mairi-Luise Tabbakh, Fenton Bailey, Oliver Sylvester, and Joe Webb.
- The Gold Experience - Solo exhibition by Marco Grassi
- NIL - Solo exhibition by Mr. Jago

2014

- ‘U’ #HelloU exhibition. Artists: Mr and Mrs Philip Cath, Mark Demsteader, Henrik Uldalen, Ivan Alifan, and Jake Wood-Evans.
