= Dirwish Al Asywti =

Egyptian writer and poet

- Born: 6 August 1946 (age 80)
- Occupations: writer, poet, playwright

Dirwish Hanafi Darwish, better known as Darwish al-Asywti (Arabic: درويش الأسيوطي). Dirwish (born August 6, 1946, in Hammamiya, Assiut Governorate, Egypt ) is a writer, poet, playwright, screenwriter and researcher in Egyptian folklore.

== Education ==
Dirwish received his Bachelor of Commerce from Ain Shams University in 1973, and he also obtained an MBA from Ain Shams University in 1974.

== Career ==
Dirwish started writing poetry since the preparatory stage, and began publishing in 1966 in Arab magazines and newspapers, including Al-Shier, Al- Hilal, October, Culture, Ibdaa Cairo, Al-Bayan and Al-Araby. He has also written radio skits and directed plays. He also represented the Assiut National Theater Company and won the First Actor Award in 1971, then was appointed as a theater director in the popular culture in 1984. His works were presented at Al-Talia Theater, Youth Theatre, Al-Ghad Theater, the National Children's Theater in Cairo and the governorates, and the Qatari Dam Theatre.

== Publications ==
=== Poetry collections ===
- A song for Sinai (Original title: ughniat lisina), a joint poetry collection, about the Egyptian Book Authority, 1975
- Love in Exile (Original title: alhubu fi alghurbati), Poetry in Egyptian Colloquial, Special Publishing, 1985
- Gray song (Original title: ughniat ramadiatun), classical poetry, on the authority of the Egyptian Book Authority, 1987
- From the Travels of the Heart (Original title: min 'asfar alqalba), Poetry in Classical, on the authority of Culture Palaces, 1994
- From Seasons of Bad Time (Original title: min fusul alzaman alradi), poetry in classical Arabic, about the center of Arab civilization
- Songs for the morning (Original title: ughniat lilsabahi), poetry for the child, on the series Qatar Dew, Egypt, 1996
- Instead of Silence (Original title: badalan min alsamta), Poetry in Classical Arabic, On the Center of Arab Civilization, 2000
- From the Conditions of the Lover Darwish (Original title: min 'ahwal aldarwish aleashiq), Classical Poetry, Egyptian Book Organization, 2003
- A story about doves (Original title: hikayat ean alyamamu), poetry for the child, the book "Qatar Dew", Cultural Palaces Authority, 2003
- Instead of Silence (Original title: badalan min alsamta), Poetry in Classical, Family Library, 2004
- The Last Confession (Original title: aliaetiraf al'akhira), The Egyptian Book Organization, The Culture Palaces Authority, 2008
- The complete poetic works of Darwish Al-Asyouti (Original title: al'aemal alshieriat alkamilat lidarwish al'asyuti), The General Authority for Cultural Palaces
- The Complete Poetic Works of Darwish Al-Asyouti: Part Two (Original title: althaqafa al'aemal alshieriat alkamilat lidarwish al'asyuti: aljuz' althaani), The General Authority for Cultural Palaces, 2012

==== Theatrical works ====
- A dramatic investigation into an accident (Original title: tahqiq diramiun fi hadith earida), special edition, Upper Egypt Association for Arts and Letters, 1985
- In the authenticity of history(Original title: fi sihat altaarikhi), Association of Pioneers of the Palace of Culture in Assiut, 1985
- Wedding Clip(Original title: eurs kilib), The Egyptian General Book Organization, Ishraqat, 1989
- He(Original title: hu), Poetic Play, Assiut Culture Branch, 2000
- The Deceiver(Original title: almukhadiei), a poetic play, Assiut Culture Branch, 2000
- Kidd Al-Basous (Original title: kayd albusus), The General Book Authority, 2002, New Ishraqat, 2003
- The Sultanate's Dream(Original title: hulm alsaltanati), Text Guide 11, Culture Palaces Authority, 2003
- Abu Ajour Sultan Hayer(Original title: 'abu eujur sultan hayar), Guide to Texts, Culture Palaces Authority, 2004

===== Periodicals and non-periodicals =====
- Summer's brutal party (Original title: haflat samar wahshiatun), Al Bayan Magazine, Kuwait, 1989
- Mid-time dreams Al-Bayan Magazine (Original title: 'ahlam muntasaf alwaqt majalat albayani), Kuwait, 1989
- Stranger Things (Original title: 'ashya' gharibat majalat 'aqlami), Aqlam Magazine, Sohag, 1990
- Al-Madia (Original title: almaediat), a book on preparing leaders in youth and sports, 1992
- The Deceiver (Original title: almakhadie), Theatrical Horizons Magazine, Culture Palaces Authority, 1992
- The Prince's Horse (Original title: hisan al'amir), Leaders Preparation Book, Youth and Sports, 1993
- The Leader of the Assassins (Original title: zaeim alqatalat), Leadership Development Book, Youth and Sports, 1994
- The Journey Through Distance Zero (Original title: alrihlat eabr almasafat sifr), Al Khaleej Newspaper, UAE, 1994, Dialogue, 1996
- Abu Ajour Concert (Original title: haflat 'abu eujur afaq almasrahi), Horizons of the Theatre, Culture Palaces Authority, 1998
- The Good News for the Child (Original title: albisharat liltifli), Buds of Faith, Issue 185
- The Poetry of the Pregnant Prince of the Child (Original title: shaear al'amir alhamil liltifli), Buds of Faith, Issue 193
- The Reward of the Envy of the Child (Original title: jaza' alhasid liltifla), Buds of Faith, Issue 222
- The judge's wisdom for the child (Original title: hikmat alqadi liltifla), Buds of Faith, Issue 239
- Princess Umm Bilal for the child (Original title: al'amirat 'am bilal liltifla), the buds of faith
- The Return of the Prisoner to the Child (Original title: eawdat al'asir liltifli), Buds of Faith, Issue 339

Studies and popular literature:

- Playing the Children: Popular Studies Library Series, Culture Palaces Authority, 2002
- The role of folklore in education: an article, Turath magazine, Emirates, December 2002
- From the songs of the cradle: Book, Library of Popular Studies Series, Cultural Palaces Authority, 2003
- Forms of the many in Upper Egypt: A book, Folk Studies, Culture Palaces Authority, 2006
- The popular joys of Upper Egypt: From rituals and texts for celebrations of marriage, pregnancy, childbirth, and circumcision, The Egyptian General Book Organization, 2012
- Singing farmers in Upper Egypt, The General Authority for Cultural Palaces, 2016
- Crimes of novel, robbery, and interpretation of folk songs in Upper Egypt, General Egyptian Book Organization, 2018
- Notes on the interpretation of the vocabulary of folk songs in Upper Egypt, a study, Journal of Folklore, Egypt
- From Pictures of Women in One Thousand and One Nights: A Study, Al Mohit Al Thaqafi Journal, Egypt
- Pregnancy, Childbirth and Circumcision: On Arabic Books Website, electronic publication
- Popular Joy: on Arabic Books website, electronic publication

Novels:

- Userkaf.. The Eternity Papyrus, Dar Al-Hilal, 2006

21st-century Egyptian writers

== Awards ==
- A certificate of appreciation from the mass culture of my two plays: In the Truth of History and Waiting for Adam. 1982
- Third place in the children's theater competition in the International Center for Theater competition, 1983
- The second prize from the popular culture, 1984, for the play "A Darkness Case"
- First place in theatrical composition, competition of Jizan Club, Saudi Arabia, 1990
- The second prize from the National Center for the Child, 1990, for the play A Boy and a Lion
- The first prize from preparing the leaders for the play Al-Madiya, 1993
- First prize prepared by leaders, 1994, for the play The Prince's Horse
- First prize prepared by leaders, 1995, for the play "Leader of Assassins"
- State Incentive Award in Poetry, 1997
- Shield of the Egyptian Association for Theater Amateurs, 1998, for his role in writing for the child
- Best Play Award in Regional Publishing, Short Plays, 2001
- First Prize of Ahmed Bakathir Theatrical Competition, 2007
