= Errol Arendz =

South African fashion designer

- Born: Errol Arthur Arendse; 16 October 1953 (age 72); Cape Town, South Africa
- Education: Ivor Kirsten Academy of Fashion (Johannesburg)
- Labels: Errol Arendz; Errol Arendz DuSud
- Relatives: Rolf Theiler (brother in law)

Errol Arthur Arendz (born 16 October 1953) is a South African fashion designer.

== Early life ==
Born Arendse, Arendz grew up in Elsie's River, a suburb of Cape Town. He studied in Paris and worked in London in the 70's and officially launched his career in 1973 after graduating from the Ivor Kirsten Academy of Fashion in Johannesburg.

== Career ==
Arendz became known in South Africa in 1978, when Fair Lady Magazine featured Barbara Barnard wearing his first collection. He sewed her coat on his Bernina sewing machine at home.

He set up a studio in Cape Town while he was still in his 20s. When Margaret Gardiner became Miss South Africa, Arendz designed her ball gown for the Miss Universe contest, which she won. His company, Errol Arendz Fashion Designer cc, was incorporated in 1986.

Arendz was popular under apartheid, with fashion magazines emphasizing the fact that he was coloured. "We did not care about politics, my sister Gloria and I just wanted to succeed. Then nobody saw us as black or white any more; if anything, we were silver - outside all categories," he commented later.

In 2003, Arendz was commissioned by South African Airways (SAA) to design the uniforms for all their crew, ground staff and flight attendants. He started designing shoes in 2005.

The Errol Arendz flagship store occupies an entire building in Hout Street in Cape Town. His clients have included Priscilla Presley, Joan Collins, Shakira Caine, Joanna Lumley, Sharon Stone, Jaclyn Smith, Elita de Klerk, Pam Golding and Karen Barnard.

He was a judge on the reality TV modeling competition Revlon Supermodel in 2007 and L'Ormarins Queen's Plate Racing Festival in 2017.
