= David Nahmad =

Lebanese former art dealer

- Born: 1947 (age 78–79); Beirut, Lebanon
- Occupation: Retired art dealer
- Spouse: Colette Soued
- Children: 3, including Joseph, Helly Nahmad
- Parent(s): Hillel Nahmad; Mathilde Safra
- Relatives: Giuseppe "Joseph" Nahmad (brother); Ezra Nahmad (brother) (nephew) Helly Nahmad (London)

David Nahmad (born 1947) is a Lebanese billionaire and former fine art dealer. He is a descendant of a Syrian Jewish art family residing in Monaco. Forbes estimates his net worth at US$4 billion as of February 2026.

== Origin ==
The roots of the Nahmad family are in Aleppo, Syria, where Sephardic Jewish banker Hillel Nahmad lived and ran a successful business until just after the Second World War. Following anti-Jewish violence in Syria in 1947, Hillel Nahmad moved to Beirut, Lebanon and when the situation there became difficult, Hillel took his three sons, Joseph (Giuseppe), Ezra and David, to Milan in the early 1960s.

== Art dealing ==
As teenagers in the 1960s, they began to deal in art. Ezra and David used free-time after school to trade on the Italian stock market. At a Juan Gris exhibition in Rome organised by cubist dealer Daniel-Henry Kahnweiler, Ezra and David bought two works – the only pieces sold. Kahnweiler befriended them, selling them works by Pablo Picasso, Georges Braque, and Gris. With the emergence of the Red Brigades terror group in the 1970s, Milan was perceived as too dangerous, and the family moved again. Joseph and Ezra headed for Monaco, and David to New York City.

Helly Nahmad Gallery, located at the luxury Carlyle Hotel on Madison Avenue, is a company run by David’s son Hillel "Helly" Nahmad, who took over his father’s earlier Davlyn Gallery in 2000. In 2013 the Gallery was raided by the FBI in connection to a sweep of gambling and money laundering operations of the Russian Mafia.

Jeffrey Deitch, art dealer and former director of the Museum of Contemporary Art, Los Angeles, once described the Nahmads as "like a major brokerage firm in the stock market", adding: "The market needs a force like this to function." Sarah Thornton discusses their significant influence on the auction market Seven Days in the Art World.

According to the cartel presented at the Beyeler Fondation in Basel during The Young Picasso Periods Blue and Pink exhibition, the Nahmad collection now owns Young Girl with a Flower Basket (1905), bought in 2018 for 115 million dollars at the Rockefeller sale at Christie's.

== Seated Man with a Cane ==
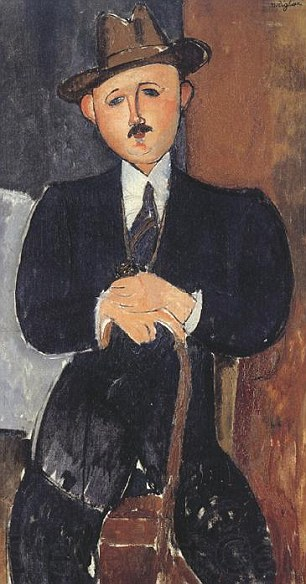
Amedeo Modigliani, Seated Man with a Cane, 1918.

In 2011, Philippe Maestracci filed suit in the United States District Court for the Southern District of New York, seeking title to the 1918 Amedeo Modigliani painting Seated Man with a Cane, valued at more than $25 million. Maestracci claimed that the painting had been looted from his grandfather, Oscar Stettiner, during World War II. In 2012, after Defendants moved to dismiss, Maestracci’s counsel withdrew that complaint. In 2015, the Limited Ancillary Administrator for the Estate of Oscar Stettiner filed suit in the Supreme Court of the State of New York, County of New York, seeking the same relief sought in federal court.

The amended complaint in that action was the subject of a recent motion to dismiss with Defendants’ counsel arguing, among other things, that Defendants purchased the painting in good faith at a public Christie’s auction in London, that Oscar Stettiner did not actually own the subject painting, and that provenance research about the painting is being provided by experts in the field. Plaintiff's counsel contends that this painting had been sold out of the possessions of Jewish art dealer Oscar Stettiner by an administrator appointed under the Nazi occupation of Paris. In April, 2016, Swiss authorities seized the painting from the Geneva Freeport as part of an ongoing investigation. Following a court decision in 2017, Maestracci was granted standing to continue with his 2014 lawsuit to reclaim the work.

In the January 2020 edition of the Art Newspaper new evidence is referred to with respect to a 1950 document, which contains a photograph of the painting on one side and the words "stolen" and "Stettiner family" on the reverse. This new evidence is further proof that the Seated Man With a Cane is the very same painting as the one stolen from Oscar Stettiner.

In April 2026, a judge ruled against a holding company controlled by David Nahmad, which had bought the work at auction in 1996.

== Personal life ==
Nahmad is married to Colette Nahmad. They have three children, Helly Nahmad, Joe Nahmad, and Marielle Safra. Marielle is married to Edmond M. Safra, son of the late Brazilian banker Moise Safra.

He is the 1996 Backgammon World Champion and is known for betting large amounts of money on the game.
