= Enoc Perez =

Puerto Rican visual artist (born 1967)

- Born: Enoc Perez; November 20, 1967 (age 58); San Juan, Puerto Rico
- Known for: Visual arts
- Website: www.enocperez.com

Enoc Perez (born 1967) is a contemporary Puerto Rican artist best known for his paintings and oil stick drawings of Modernist architecture.

== Background ==
Perez was born in 1967 in San Juan, Puerto Rico. He obtained a BFA from the Pratt Institute and an MFA from Hunter College, both in New York. He began painting depictions of landmark buildings in the city, notably of the Headquarters of the United Nations, Lever House, and the Seagram Building.

== Career ==
Perez's works are held in the collections of the Corcoran Art Gallery in Washington, D.C., the Whitney Museum of American Art in New York, and the Pennsylvania Academy of Fine Arts in Philadelphia, among others.

== Personal life ==
Perez lives and works in New York, NY.

== Solo exhibitions ==
- 2018

Dallas Contemporary, Dallas, TX

- 2017

UTA Artist Space, Los Angeles, CA. "Embassies" Brand New Gallery, Milan, Italy. "Casitas" Leila Heller Gallery, Dubai, United Arab Emirates. "Desert Bloom" Harper Books, East Hampton, NY. "Nudes"

- 2015

Koenig & Clinton, New York. "Digs" Peter Blum Gallery, New York. "One World Trade Center" The Philip Johnson Glass House. New Canaan, Connecticut, "Lipstick" Galerie Nathalie Obadia, Paris. "Recent Paintings" Danziger Gallery, New York. "Cut-Outs"

- 2014

Harper's Books, East Hampton, NY. "Summer Jobs" Thomas Ammann Fine Arts AG, Zurich. "New Work" Le Royal Monceau, Paris. "Paintings"

- 2013

Galerie Nathalie Obadia, Paris. "Paris Mon Amour" Acquavella Galleries, New York. "The Good Days"

- 2012

Corcoran Art Gallery, Washington D.C.. "Utopia"

- 2011

Galerie Nathalie Obadia, Bruxelles. "Works on paper" Faggionato Fine Arts, London. "Nudes"

- 2010

Acquavella Galleries, New York. Galerie Michael Janssen, Berlin. "Monochromes"

- 2009

Mitchell-Innes & Nash, New York

- 2008

Galerie Michael Janssen, Berlin. "Tender" Collezione Maramotti, Reggio Emilia, Italy. Faggionato Fine Arts, London. "Suite 720"

- 2007

Museum of Contemporary Art North Miami Lever House Lobby Gallery, NY Galerie Nathalie Obadia, Paris "Faraway"

- 2006

Mitchell-Innes & Nash, New York, NY, "New York" Faggionato, New York, "Works on Paper" Mario Diacono at ARS LIBRI, Boston, MA, "The United Nations, New York"

- 2005

Faggionato, London, "Deluxe"

2004 The Happy Lion, Los Angeles, CA, "Caribe Club" Sammlung Sander, Berlin, Germany "The Party" Elizabeth Dee, New York, NY "Works on Paper"

- 2003

Elizabeth Dee, New York, NY "Monuments"

- 2002

Kunstverein Heilbronn, Germany, "Holiday" Elisabeth Dee Gallery, New York, NY, "New Work" Dee / Glasoe, New York, NY "Enoc Perez"

- 2001

Galerie Michael Janssen, Cologne, "The Secret"

- 1999

Bronwyn Keenan Gallery, New York, NY, "Winter" Turner & Runyon, Dallas, Texas, "Daydreaming"

- 1993

White Columns, New York, NY Galeria Uno, Caracas, Venezuela
