= Marc Meyohas =

Franco-British, London-based businessman (born 1971)

Marc Joseph Meyohas
- Born: 1971 (age 53–54)
- Known for: Co-founder of Greybull Capital
- Family: Nathaniel Meyohas (brother); Sarah Meyohas (sister)

Marc Joseph Meyohas (born June 1971) is a French, London-based businessman who is the managing partner in Greybull Capital, which he founded with his brother Nathaniel Meyohas.

== Biography ==
Meyohas was born in Paris, France to a Sephardi Jewish family. His sister is New York artist Sarah Meyohas. He attended Clifton College in Bristol, United Kingdom and graduated from the University of Manchester with a BA in Economics (1990–1993). From January 1996 to December 2007 he was the chief executive officer of Cityspace. He later obtained British citizenship.
