= Oscar Stettiner =

British antique and art dealer (1878–1948)

- Born: 1878
- Died: 1948 (aged 69–70)
- Occupation: Art dealer
- Organization: Stettiner et Cie.

Oscar Stettiner (1878 – 1948) was a British antique and art dealer, based in Paris, and whose art allegedly was "seized and auctioned during the Nazi occupation of France."

== Biography ==
Oscar Stettiner was born in 1878, the son of Henri Jules Stettiner and his wife Gertrude Davis. He had an older brother Alphonse, born in 1876, and a sister, Adele Stettiner, born in 1880. Oscar and Alphonse had British nationality; Adele French, and they were of Jewish ancestry.

After Stettiner's father Henri retired, he gave his business to his children, and Stettiner became a partner at Stettiner et Cie. with his siblings. The business operated internationally. Initially the company was headed by Alphonse, and then by Oscar Stettiner in 1935 on. Shortly after World War II started on 3 September 1939, on 20 November 1939 the Stettiner family closed their Paris gallery in Avenue Matignon. Stettiner subsequently moved to his home in the Dordogne. His personal possessions were seized by the Nazis, and the gallery's trading stock seized as well, and auctioned off over several days between February and May 1943. In 1943, Stettiner was arrested, and afterwards imprisoned in La Grande Caserne Denis. He survived the war along with his siblings Alphonse and Adele, with Stettiner dying in 1948.

== Seated Man with a Cane ==
Stettiner's grandson hired Mondex, a Canadian company that is paid a 39 1/2 percent recovery fee that alleges Stettiner owned Seated Man with a Cane—that claim and the alleged attribution of ownership is now vigorously contested in a New York State lawsuit by the owner of the painting who legally acquired it at a London Christie's auction sale in 1996.
