= Henrik Aarrestad Uldalen =

Norwegian oil painter (born 1986)

Henrik Aarrestad Uldalen (born 1986 in South Korea, but raised in Asker Norway) is a Norwegian oil painter. Uldalen is a self-taught artist whose work includes classic figurative painting. He paints people in oils and then pieces these images in impossible scenes such as climbing upside down spiral staircases, or falling from tilted buildings. His work has been described as photosurrealism.

Although he uses a various range of models in his work, he states that they are all representations of himself and his state of mind. When he sets up the painting he tries to get the model to evoke the same emotions that he is going through at the moment. His works serve as a diary that records his different states of being from different moments in time.

== Paintguide ==
Uldalen and co-founders set-up Paintguide in January 2014. The project started as a forum for artists from all over the world to share their favourite artworks and inspirations to the public, the project took form as a website, and Instagram. Following a highly successful takeover of the Paintguide account by Alex Kanevsky, Uldalen found himself inundated with requests for Paintguide takeovers from other like-minded, social media savvy artists. Contributed by over 60 artists and painters, the Paintguide’s following grew exponentially, and currently stands over 329,000 followers.

In November 2015, the Paintguide project took form as a pop-up exhibition at Unit London gallery. Showing over 60 artists from their Paintguide Instagram account, such as Jeremy Geddes, Jeremy Mann, Martin Wittfooth, Greg “Craola” Simkins and Dan Quintana. Alongside the exhibition being set up, Uldalen set-up a Kickstarter campaign for the Paintguide book, showcasing the 60 first artists who took over the Instagram page, displaying 5 of their favourite artworks. It was successfully funded on 28 November.

== Exhibitions ==
=== Solo exhibitions ===
- 2021 JD Malat Gallery. "Love in Exile". London, UK
- 2018 JD Malat Gallery. London, UK
- 2014 Thinkspace. Los Angeles, USA
- 2011 Galerie Contour. Skagen, Denmark
- 2010 Galleri Ramfjord. Oslo, Norway
- 2009 Galleri Ramfjord. Oslo, Norway

=== Group exhibitions ===
- 2021 Spring Gardens Flats. “NuArt Aberdeen”. Aberdeen, Scotland
- 2015 Friends Of Leon Gallery. “Les Petit Fours”. Sydney, AU
- 2015 Gallery 1261. “Unfurl”. Denver, USA
- 2015 Inner State Gallery. “LAX/DTW”. Detroit, USA
- 2015 Galleri Ramfjord. “Scope Art Show”. New York, USA
- 2015 LA Municipal Art Gallery. “20 Years Under The Influence of Juxtapoz”. Los Angeles, USA
- 2015 Modern Eden. “Platinum Blend”. San Francisco, USA
- 2015 Hashimoto Contemporary. “The Moleskine Project 4”. San Francisco, USA
- 2014 Arcadia Contemporary. “Scope Art Fair”. New York, USA
- 2014 Thinkspace. “LA Art Show”. Los Angeles, USA
- 2014 Arcadia Contemporary. “LA Art Show”. Los Angeles, USA
- 2014 Arcadia Contemporary. New York, USA
- 2014 Thinkspace. Los Angeles, USA
- 2013 Corey Helford Gallery. “Art Collector Starter Kit”. Los Angeles, USA
- 2013 Gallery 1261. “Contemporary Realism”. Denver, USA
- 2013 Thinkspace. Los Angeles, USA
- 2012 Galleri Ramfjord. Oslo, Norway
- 2012 NOo Sphere Arts. “Beautiful Maladies”. New York, USA
- 2012 Spoke Art. San Francisco, USA
- 2012 J. LeVine Gallery. “Art Basel”, Switzerland
- 2012 Thinkspace. Los Angeles, USA
- 2012 Stricoff Fine Art. New York, USA
- 2011 Galleri Ramfjord. Oslo, Norway
- 2011 S Cube Gallery. Los Angeles, USA
- 2011 .NO New York. New York, USA
- 2011 Galleri V58. “Magic Realism”. Århus, Denmark
- 2010 Galerie Contour. Skagen, Denmark
- 2010 Galleri Ramfjord. Oslo, Norway
