= Helly Nahmad (London) =

Italian art dealer

- Born: Hillel Nahmad; 23 November 1976 (age 49)
- Education: Courtauld Institute of Art
- Occupation: Art dealer
- Children: 3, including Ezra "Ezy", Joshua, Elijah Nahmad
- Parent(s): Ezra Nahmad; Marie Katri
- Relatives: Giuseppe "Joseph" Nahmad (uncle); David Nahmad (uncle)

Hillel "Helly" Nahmad (born 23 November 1976) is a UK and Monaco based multi-billionaire art dealer.

Nahmad's estimated net worth is $1.3 billionn- $2.5 billion. https://www.forbes.com/billionaires/

== Early life ==
Hillel "Helly" Nahmad was born on 23 November 1976, the son of fellow art dealer Ezra Nahmad. He attended St Paul's School before studyinging History of Art at the Courtauld Institute of Art. In 1997, he had a course in Italian nationality.

== Career ==
In 1998, Nahmad founded an eponymous modern art gallery in Cork Street, Mayfair, showcasing works by Pablo Picasso, Wassily Kandinsky, Henri Matisse, Claude Monet, René Magritte, Kasimir Malevich and Joan Miró, among others.

In 2011, Nahmad curated an exhibition of highlights from the Nahmad Collection at Kunsthaus Zurich. The exhibition collected over 100 artworks by artists from the Impressionist, Surrealist and Cubist movements, including Claude Monet, Edgar Degas, Pierre-Auguste Renoir, Henri de Toulouse-Lautrec, Pablo Picasso, Juan Gris, René Magritte, Max Ernst, Joan Miró, and Georges Braque.

This exhibition was followed in 2013 by Picasso in the Nahmad Collection, at the Grimaldi Forum in Monaco, an exhibition of over 120 works from the collection. The exhibition was curated by the Director of the Musée Picasso in Antibes, Jean-Louis Andral, and Marilyn McCully.

Recent exhibitions at the Helly Nahmad Gallery in London have included a retrospective of Monet, which featured seventeen paintings by the Impressionist, including two views of London, loaned by the Kunsthaus in Zurich. The Financial Times called the exhibition "the best show in London this winter". This was followed by an exhibition of Matisse's female portraits and included a loan from Tate Modern of one painting, 'La Liseuse distraite' (1919), along with the artist's series of four bronze female backs, entitled Nu de dos I-IV, which were conceived c. 1909–30.

In 2014, Helly Nahmad presented The Collector at Frieze Masters 2014, curated by Helly Nahmad and designed by Robin Brown and creative producer Anna Pank. Scott Reyburn of The International New York Times stated that "London dealer Helly Nahmad evoked that "true" collecting spirit". Helly Nahmad London commissioned a short film of The Collector, inspired by their Frieze stand.
