= Ezra Nahmad =

Monegasque fine art collector and dealer (born 1945)

- Born: 1945; Beirut, Lebanon
- Died: December 2023 (aged 77–78)
- Occupations: Art dealer and collector
- Spouse: Marie Katri
- Children: 4, including Helly Nahmad
- Relatives: Giuseppe "Joseph" Nahmad (brother); David Nahmad (brother)

Ezra Nahmad (1945–December 2023) was a Monegasque billionaire art dealer and collector of Syrian descent. He lived in Monte Carlo, Monaco. Forbes estimates his net worth was US$1.8 billion in 2023.

== Biography ==
Ezra was born in Beirut, Lebanon to a Sephardic Jewish family. The roots of the Nahmad family are in Aleppo, Syria, where his father, banker Hillel Nahmad lived until just after World War II. Following the Syrian anti-Jewish violence in 1949, his father moved to Beirut, where Ezra and his brothers sold English novels to US sailors stationed there. In the early 1960s, With the rise of Israeli threat against the Lebanese Republic, Ezra's father took him and his brothers, Joseph (Giuseppe) and David, to Milan, Italy. As teenagers, the three began to deal in art, and skipped school to trade on the Italian stock market.

Ezra's first career milestone is believed to have taken place at a Juan Gris exhibition in Rome, organized by cubist dealer Daniel-Henry Kahnweiler. Ezra and his brother bought two works – the only pieces sold. Kahnweiler befriended them, selling them works by Picasso, Braque, and Gris. With the emergence of the Red Brigades terror group in the 1970s, Milan was perceived as too dangerous, and the family moved again. Ezra and his brother Joseph headed for Monaco, and David to New York City.

== Art collection ==
As of 2007, Ezra and his brother David are considered influential "mega-dealers" of modern and impressionist art by the most well-known names, from Monet and Matisse to Renoir and Rothko. They own an inventory of between 4,500 and 5,000 works, stored in the duty-free Geneva Freeport warehouse next to the airport in Geneva, Switzerland. The brothers buy and sell most of their works at auction. In 2007, Forbes estimated that Ezra, together with his brother David have built an art collection worth $3 to 4 billion. A 2015 billionaires' index places Ezra and his brother David the richest residents of Monaco.

In the 2016 Panama Papers leak scandal, Ezra Nahmad's name was associated to his family's web of offshore companies and schemes to evade taxes and manipulate the art market.

== Personal life ==
Nahmad was married to Marie Nahmad, resides in Monaco, and has four children. His son Helly Nahmad is a London-based art dealer. His daughter Michaela Nahmad is married to investor Nathaniel Meyohas. His cousin is the Brazilian banker Edmond Safra.
