= Giuseppe Nahmad =

Syrian art dealer

- Born: 1932; Aleppo, Syria
- Died: 23 November 2012 (aged 79–80); Monte Carlo, Monaco
- Resting place: Jerusalem
- Occupation: Art dealer
- Parent(s): Hillel Nahmad; Mathilde Safra
- Relatives: David Nahmad (brother); Ezra Nahmad (brother)

Giuseppe ("Joe") Nahmad (1932 – 23 November 2012) was an art dealer who specialized in Impressionist, Post-Impressionist, and modern art. He amassed a multi-billion fortune in buying, selling, and collecting works of arts of 19th- and 20th-century artists.

== Family ==
Giuseppe Nahmad was born in 1932 in Aleppo, Syria. His father Hillel Nahmad was a banker who founded Nahmad & Beyda in Syria. The Nahmads were Sephardic Jews who spoke French, Arabic and several other languages. Hillel Nahmad opened a branch of Nahmad & Beyda in Beirut, Lebanon, after he and his wife, Mathilde Nahmad, moved there in 1948. They had eight children: four boys (Albert, Giuseppe, Ezra, David) and four girls (Denise Nahmad Amon, Jacqueline Nahmad Harari, Nadia Nahmad Chowaiki, Evelyn Nahmad Matalan). In 1958, Albert, having expanded the family banking business to Rio de Janeiro, died in an airplane crash.

In 1957, Giuseppe Nahmad settled in Milan where he started his art dealership. Two years later his parents and his younger siblings resettled in Milan. Giuseppe's younger brothers, David and Ezra, joined the enterprise while still being teenagers in 1963. David and Ezra's own sons, both named Hillel, run galleries in New York and London currently.

Giuseppe Nahmad never married and had no children.

== Career ==
Nahmad discovered Lucio Fontana and commissioned paintings by Wifredo Lam. When prices were especially low in Paris and, for Nahmad, resale margins in Milan ranged from 50% to 100%.

Nahmad and his brothers bought Picasso's 1955 portrait of his second wife Jacqueline in 1995 for $2.6 million. They held it for twelve years and sold it for $30.8 million. In the 1970s, Nahmad bought several Picassos at prices from $40,000 to $50,000 apiece. In the 1980s, Nahmad moved into the Japan market and continued buying art through 1989 downturn.

During this period Ezra and David Nahmad opened galleries in New York City and London.

== Controversy and media coverage ==
In December 2007, an article in Forbes quoted allegations that the younger Nahmad brothers habitually changed the terms of their deals at the last minute. David Nahmad denied the allegations. The same Forbes article credited the Nahmads with stabilizing the auction business by buying art in bulk even during – or especially during – market downturns. "They are like a major brokerage firm in the stock market; the market needs a force like this to function," said New York dealer Jeffrey Deitch.

In 2011, part of the Nahmad collection was first shown at the Kunsthaus Zürich. The exhibit generated some controversy as the museum was criticized for purportedly catering to the family's broader business interests.

== Death ==
Giuseppe Nahmad died in Monte Carlo on 23 November 2012. He was buried on 26 November 2012 in Jerusalem, next to his parents and near his brother Albert. Most of his surviving siblings, and nearly all his nieces and nephews attended, though word of the patriarch's death was not released to the media.
