= Titus (praenomen) =

Latin personal name

Titus (/ˈtaɪtəs/ TY-təs, Latin pronunciation: [ˈtɪtʊs]), feminine Tita or Titia, is a Latin praenomen, or personal name, and was one of the most common names throughout Roman history. For most of Roman history, Titus was the sixth most common praenomen, following Lucius, Gaius, Marcus, Publius, and Quintus. While not used by every family, it was widely used by all social classes including both patricians and plebeians and was a favorite of many families and gave rise to the patronymic gens Titia. It was regularly abbreviated T. The name survived the Roman Empire, and has continued to be used, in various forms, into modern times.

== Origin and meaning ==
The original meaning of Titus is obscure, but it was widely believed to have come to Rome during the time of Romulus, the founder and first king of Rome. Early in his reign, a war with the Sabines ended with the migration of a great many Sabine families to Rome, and Titus Tatius, king of the Sabine town of Cures, becoming co-regent with Romulus. Titus would thus have been an Oscan praenomen introduced to Rome, although it was later regarded as Latin. This explanation is accepted by Chase.

== Variations ==
The feminine form of Titus should be Tita, and this form is found in older inscriptions such as the Tita Vendia vase and Tita Varia inscription. However the more common form in later periods was Titia, with an "i". The same pattern was followed by the praenomen Marca or Marcia.

The name was borrowed by the Etruscans, who used the forms Tite (masculine) and Titi or Titia (feminine).

== See also ==
- Roman naming conventions
- List of Roman gentes#T
- List of Roman nomina
