= Jenny & Tyler =

American folk-pop band

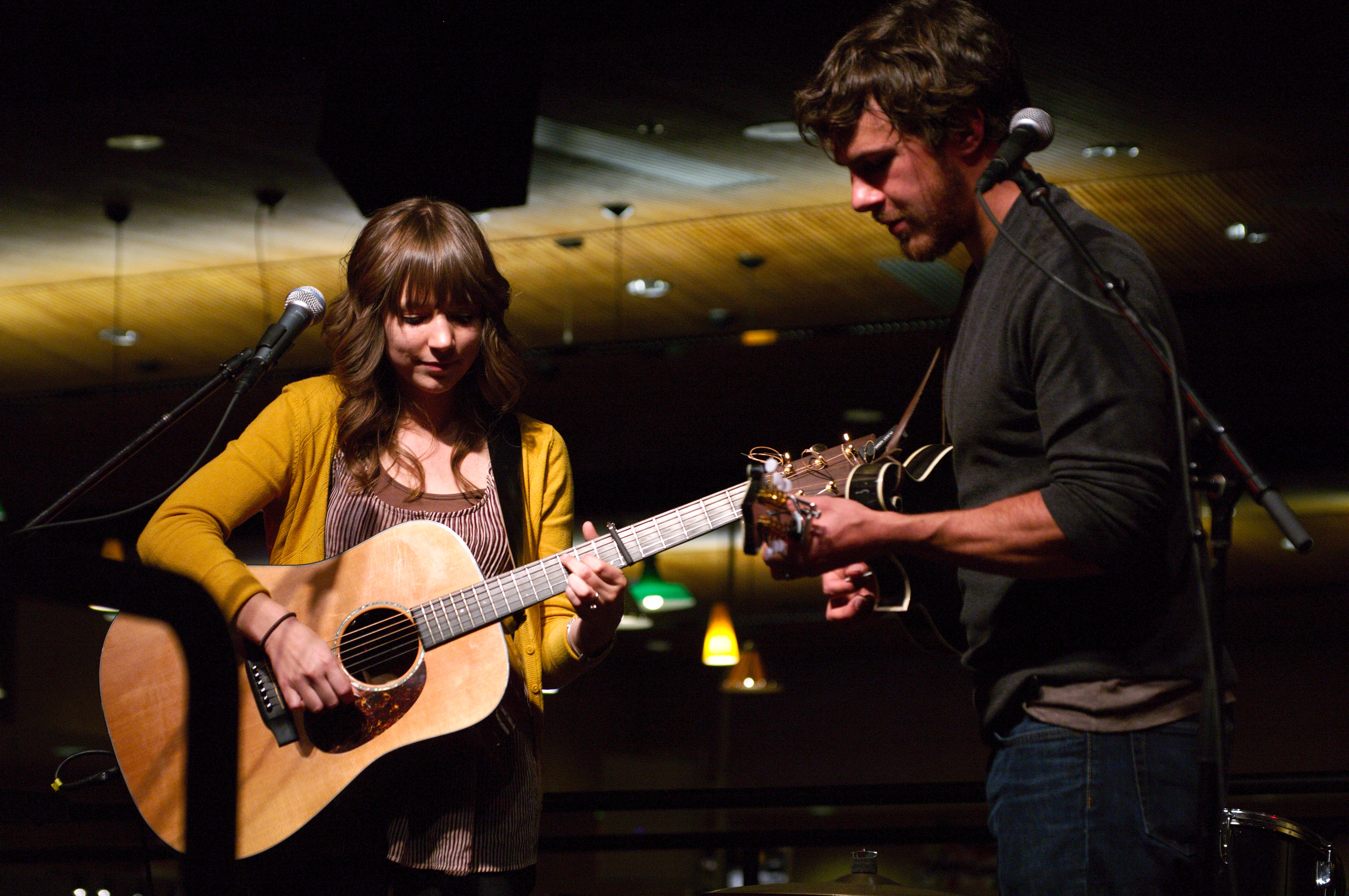
- Jenny & Tyler in 2011

Background information
- Origin: Newark, Delaware, U.S.
- Genres: Folk pop; contemporary Christian music; alternative rock; bluegrass; indie rock; indie folk
- Years active: 2004–present
- Labels: Residence
- Members: Jenny Somers; Tyler Somers
- Website: jennyandtyler.com

Jenny & Tyler are a husband-wife folk-pop band originally from Newark, Delaware, and currently based in Nashville, Tennessee. The group consists of singer-songwriters Jenny Somers and Tyler Somers. Their style is a fusion of folk, pop, funk, rock, soul, and bluegrass that has been called "soul-grass". The duo has independently released three full-length albums and two EPs, and regularly tour the United States.

== History ==
=== Musical background ===
Before Jenny's father retired from the Air Force, her family moved cross-country regularly. While being regularly uprooted, she came to find a home for self-expression in the art of songwriting at an early age. Since she grew up immersed in bluegrass, old country, and Bob Marley. These musical styles have shaped the duo's creative process ever since. Her father has begun to craft musical instruments as a retirement hobby, several of which have been used by the duo in performances.

Tyler was born in Wilmington, Delaware, with both of his parents; his father Wilson Somers is a jazz composer and music teacher at The Tatnall School, and his mother is a singer. His parents exposed him to numerous music performers and styles, including jazz, classic rock such as Jimi Hendrix and Eric Clapton; folk artists including Simon & Garfunkel and James Taylor; and numerous jazz musicians, all at an early age.

Jenny and Tyler first met in late 2004 while students at the University of Delaware. Almost immediately, they began writing songs together and backing each other up at shows. Tyler formed a band with his roommate, Joel Rakes, and Jenny continued to write and perform as a solo act. After a while, Jenny and Tyler began dating, and in mid 2006 they began work on an album together.

They were married in June 2007, in between production and release of their first record, A Prelude, which was released that December. The pair spent the next year touring the mid-Atlantic states, and settled in Nashville in August 2008, to continue their musical careers.

Jenny & Tyler performed live on NBC 10 Philadelphia's 'The 10! Show' in late 2009 to promote This Isn't a Dream and a homeless benefit concert with Wilson Somers, at the Grand Opera House in Wilmington. They returned to the 10! Show in 2011 to perform "This Is Just So Beautiful."

In mid-2013, Jenny & Tyler announced the birth of their first child, a baby girl named Jane. Jenny & Tyler's second daughter Sara was born in early 2015. Their third daughter, Mary, was born in July 2017.

== Writing and recording process ==
Jenny & Tyler describe their song-writing process as very collaborative, as they constantly bounce ideas off of each other. Tyler had been the primary sound engineer and producer for all of their records until Mitch Dane produced the record Open Your Doors, which was released on April 3, 2012.

== Collaborations ==
On their 2010 release, Faint Not, Jenny & Tyler collaborated with Third Day front man Mac Powell, who provided backing vocals for the song "Carry Me". The couple had met Powell when they opened for him at a men's conference in Wilmington, DE.

They covered "We Will Become Silhouettes" by the Postal Service, along with covers by several other artists for a 10-year celebration of the band.

Jenny & Tyler have announced they are supporters of International Justice Mission in the fight against human trafficking, including their recent album of covers, For Freedom.

== Members ==
- Jennifer Frances "Jenny" Somers (born March 15, 1986)
- Tyler W. Somers (born March 20, 1985)

== Discography ==
Year	Title	Billboard chartings
2007	A Prelude	—
2009	This Isn't a Dream	—
2009	A Prelude: Acoustic EP	—
2009	Love Came Down: A Christmas EP	—
2010	Faint Not	—
2011	Live at Studio A	—
2012	Open Your Doors	Christian 31, Folk 19, Heatseekers 25
2013	For Freedom	Christian 43, Folk 21, Heatseekers 21
2015	Of This I'm Sure	Christian 40, Folk 25, Heatseekers 18
2016	Christmas Stories	Heatseekers 21
2017	For Freedom II	—

=== Faint Not ===
Faint Not is described by the couple as their first major success, and it garnered attention from many artists who would collaborate with the couple over the next few years. The couple have also stated that the album "chronicles our journey of faith". Faint Not featured the songs "As Long as Our Hearts are Beating" and "This is Just So Beautiful" which were both featured on Pretty Little Liars.

=== For Freedom ===
Jenny & Tyler have announced they are supporters of International Justice Mission in the fight against human trafficking, and state "For Freedom", their most recent album is in support of these efforts. This album is a series of covers, including "Tonight, Tonight", and "The Sound of Silence".

=== Kickstarter projects ===
The duo recently established a Kickstarter page to support a new album, as well as the production of a live album.

=== Of This I'm Sure ===
Of This I'm Sure was released October 16, 2015 from Residence Music.

=== Christmas Stories ===
2016's Christmas Stories contained two songs which were listed on the charts for a time: "Winter Wonderland" and "Christmastime".
