= Stephen Urice =

American lawyer and academic - born 1950

- Born: Stephen K. Urice; February 12, 1950 (age 76); New York
- Education: Tufts University 1972 BA in English, Harvard University Master of theological studies, PhD in fine arts.
- Occupations: Archeologist, Law professor, University of Miami School of Law
- Known for: Cultural property law

Stephen K. Urice (born February 12, 1950) is a law professor at the University of Miami School of Law in Coral Gables, Florida. He is an authority in cultural property law.

== Early life and education ==
Stephen Kraus Urice (pronounced YOUR-rice) was born in New York to parents Leonard Kraus of San Francisco, CA and Babette Block of New York who graduated from Vassar College. Stephen Urice had one sibling, John, who became a professor of theater history. Urice grew up in Delaware with his mother and brother and attended Tatnall School during his younger years and then graduated from "a small Quaker high school", Wilmington Friends High School in Wilmington, Delaware.

Urice received a BA in English from Tufts University in 1972, then "earned a master of theological studies (M.T.S.—Old Testament) and a doctorate in fine arts," at Harvard University. "During his doctoral program, based at Harvard’s Fogg Art Museum, Urice worked extensively as a field archaeologist in the Mediterranean region."

== Career ==
Urice was in Cyprus in 1974 when the Turks invaded, at which time he noted that “The research venture fell apart, and I was evacuated to Beirut, and started traveling in the Mideast.” His 1981 doctoral dissertation formed the basis of his book, Qasr Kharana in the Transjordan (1987), which presented the findings of his work as director of a Jordanian-American archaeological expedition at that early Islamic site. Urice entered Harvard Law School and graduated with the Class of 1984.

Urice began his legal practice in the Trusts and Estates department of Milbank, Tweed, Hadley & McCloy in New York City. Three years later, he moved to Los Angeles, where he joined the trusts and estates department at Irell & Manella. Urice left the practice of law in 1991 to serve as acting director of the Frederick R. Weisman Art Foundation in Los Angeles. "He later moved to Philadelphia and served as director of the Rosenbach Museum & Library. That was followed by an appointment to The Pew Charitable Trusts to plan and implement the trust’s national cultural policy program, a $50 million, five-year effort to assist nonprofit cultural organizations to participate more fully in the development of cultural policies at local, state, and federal levels."

An archaeologist and attorney, Urice served previously as a lecturer at University of Pennsylvania Law School and taught at UCLA School of Law. In 2003, Urice served as a visiting lecturer of public and international affairs at Woodrow Wilson School at Princeton University, teaching a seminar on the 1954 Hague Convention for the Protection of Cultural Property in the Event of Armed Conflict.

As of 2016, Urice was active in the Hoffman Forum which is a leadership event supported by University of Miami graduates, Larry J. Hoffman and Deborah Hoffman. The Forum is a collaboration between the Aspen Institute’s Artist-Endowed Foundations Initiative and the law school and gathers leaders to "discuss recent developments and challenges in the field".

Urice is now a professor of law at the University of Miami School of Law in Coral Gables, Florida. Since 2017, Urice oversees the International Cultural Heritage Law class held in Switzerland co-hosted with faculty from the University of Geneva.

There is a wide range of legal issues in the world of art,” Urice said. “To take just one example, when a collector purchases a work of art, does the new owner obtain good title and is the work authentic? The same issues apply when museums or collectors acquire antiquities, but the title issues are far more complex, as they may involve foreign patrimony laws.

— Stephen K. Urice

=== Books ===
- Rothfield, Lawrence (Editor), (2008). Stephen K. Urice (Contributor) and 21 others. AltaMira Press. ISBN 0759110980
- Merryman, John Henry and Albert Edward Elson, Stephen K. Urice (2007). Law, Ethics, And the Visual Arts (fifth edition). Kluwer Law Intl. ISBN 9041125175.
- Beers, Mark H., and Stephen K. Urice. (1992). Aging in Good Health: Complete, Essential Medical Guide for Older Men & Women & Their Families Atria Publishing Group. ISBN 0671728210.
- Urice, Stephen K. (1987). Qasr Kharana in the Transjordan Eisenbrauns, ISBN 0897572076.

== Personal life ==
Urice was joined in a 2000 civil union with geriatrician Mark H. Beers in Vermont. In 2008 Urice and Beers married in Montreal. Beers was a former president of the American Geriatrics Society whose research into the side-effects of prescriptions drugs for the elderly became a useful list called the Beers Criteria, which was published by the Journal of the American Medical Association in 1988. Beers died in 2009 in Miami Beach, Florida.

One of Urice's favorite pieces of classical art is the Greek terracotta Euphronios Krater that he visited often when it was on display at the Metropolitan Museum of Art. "[T]he piece was repatriated to Italy in 2008 and is now displayed at the National Archaeological Museum of Cerveteri. “I’m making a trip to Rome in the fall to see it again,” he added. 'It has that strong a pull on me.'"
