= Wilson Somers =

Jazz and vocal music instructor, composer and performer

Wilson Gault Somers is a jazz and vocal music instructor, composer and performer in the Philadelphia metropolitan area. Somers is perhaps best known for his soundtrack for Edward Loper: Prophet of Color, a documentary about the artist Edward L. Loper, Sr. which won a regional Emmy award in 2000 in the Mid-Atlantic chapter.

== Career ==
Somers has been an instructor at the Tatnall School for several years, mainly instructing vocal music, and has led a group which performed for Pope John Paul II. He has also created several original orchestral works- Somers' first large-scale composition, entitled MASS FOR THE HOMELESS, premiered to a sold-out audience at the Grand Opera House in 1997. The concert raised funds for homeless agencies in Northern Delaware, as did an encore performance of the same composition in 1999. His most recent large-scale creation, titled "Requiem for 9/11", is intended to remember the first responders of 9/11. "Requiem" premiered in 2012, and the performance raised several thousand dollars for the Flight 93 National Memorial in Shanksville, PA.’ Additionally, he is the choir director and organist for an Episcopal church in Kennett Square, Pennsylvania.

== Personal life ==
Wilson is married to Joan Somers, with whom he collaborated for his composition "Requiem for 9/11." They are also the parents of Tyler Somers, a member of the musical duo Jenny & Tyler;
