= Of This I'm Sure =

Studio album by Jenny & Tyler
- Released: October 16, 2015
- Genre: pop-folk, CCM, alternative rock, bluegrass, indie rock, indie folk
- Length: 45:08
- Label: Residence

Of This I'm Sure is a studio album from Jenny & Tyler. Residence Music released the album on October 16, 2015.

== Critical reception ==
Professional ratings
Review scores
Source	Rating
CCM Magazine	4/5 stars

Awarding the album four stars at CCM Magazine, Kevin Sparkman asserts, "With refreshing sounds, and sing-able melodies to boot...The couple's sleeve-ridden sincerity and attention to painstaking detail make this project especially enjoyable." Brian Palmer, reviewing the album from C-Ville, states, "Whether it's the driving, swelling orchestral title track or the gorgeous ambient folk-pop update of fan favorite 'Song for You,' Jenny & Tyler's latest stirs your soul with anthemic music, lyrics that wind their way through your heart and crushing harmonies."

== Track listing ==
All tracks are written by Jenny & Tyler except they were joined by Gabe Scott on No. 6 and Jillian Edwards on No. 11.

No.	Title	Length
1.	"Of This I'm Sure"	3:36
2.	"Song for You"	4:09
3.	"Beloved One"	4:19
4.	"When I Meet You"	3:24
5.	"Walk with You"	3:45
6.	"Where to Begin"	3:26
7.	"My Dear One"	4:44
8.	"You Are a Song"	3:34
9.	"Fly Away"	2:00
10.	"Once Again"	4:18
11.	"In Everything You Do"	4:02
12.	"To the Sea"	3:51
Total length:		45:08

== Chart performance ==
Chart (2015)	Peak position
US Christian Albums (Billboard)	40
US Folk Albums (Billboard)	25
US Heatseekers Albums (Billboard)	18
