= National Etruscan Museum of Villa Giulia =

Archaeological museum in Rome

National Etruscan Museum
- Museo Nazionale Etrusco
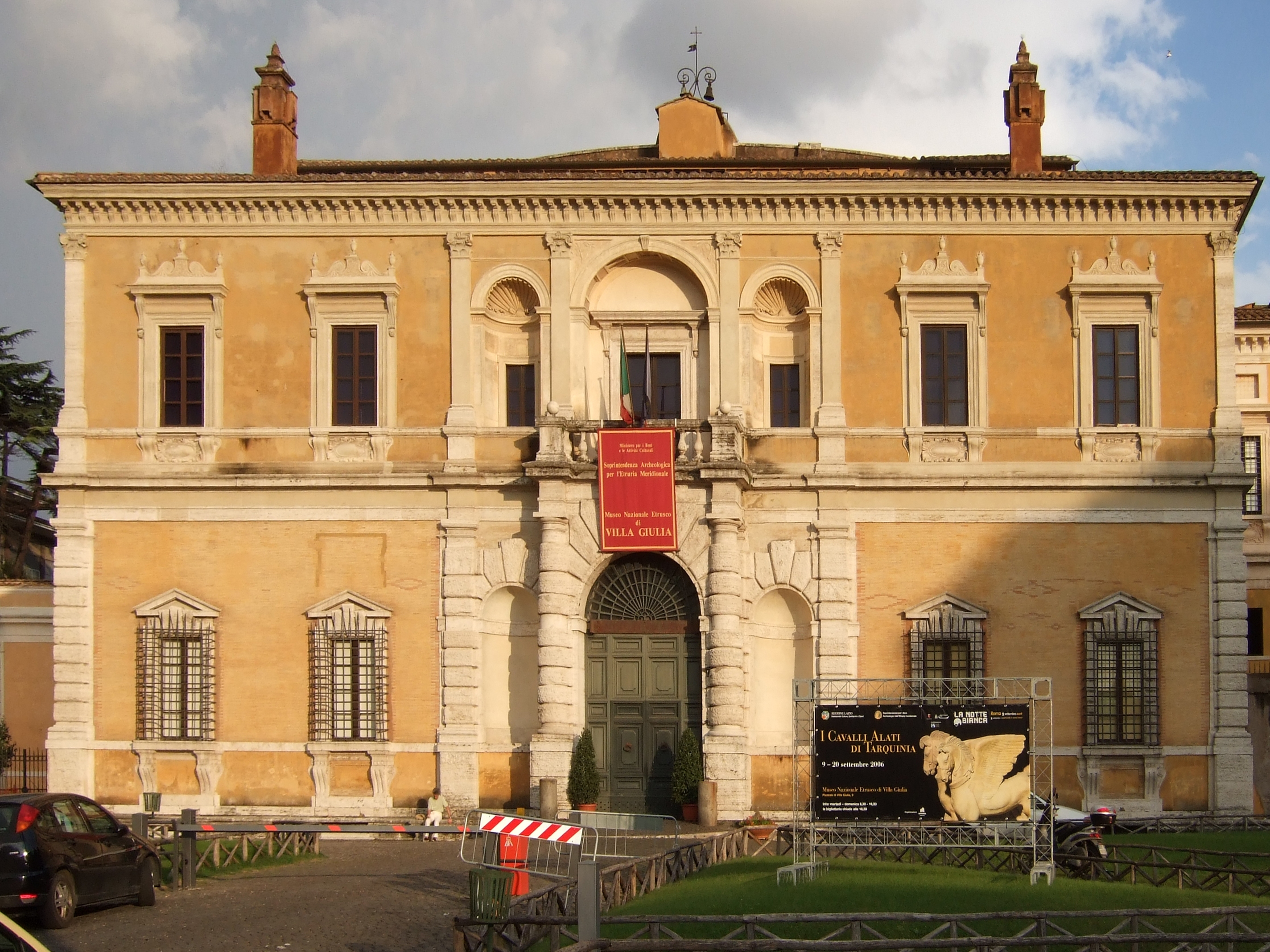
- Facade of the Villa Giulia in Rome, home of the National Etruscan Museum
- Click on the map for a fullscreen view
- Established: 1889
- Location: Piazzale di Villa Giulia, 9 Rome, Italy
- Coordinates: 41.9183°N 12.4778°E
- Type: Archaeological Museum
- Website: museoetru.it

The National Etruscan Museum (Italian: Museo Nazionale Etrusco) is a museum dedicated to the Etruscan and Faliscan civilizations, housed in the Villa Giulia in Rome, Italy. It is the most important Etruscan museum in the world.

== History ==
The villa was built for Pope Julius III, for whom it was named. It remained in papal property until 1870, when, in the wake of the Risorgimento and the demise of the Papal States, it became the property of the Kingdom of Italy. The museum was founded in 1889 as part of the same nationalistic movement, with the aim of collecting together all the pre-Roman antiquities of Latium, southern Etruria and Umbria belonging to the Etruscan and Faliscan civilizations, and has been housed in the villa since the beginning of the 20th century.

== Collections ==
The museum's most famous single treasure is the terracotta funerary monument, the almost life-size Bride and Groom (the so-called Sarcofago degli Sposi, or Sarcophagus of the Spouses), reclining as if they were at a dinner party.

Other objects held are:

- The Etruscan-Phoenician Pyrgi Tablets
- The Apollo of Veii
- The Cista Ficoroni
- A reconstructed frieze displaying Tydeus eating the brain of his enemy Melanippus
- The Tita Vendia vase
- The Centaur of Vulci
- Phoenician metal bowls
- Previously, the Sarpedon Krater (or, the "Euphronios Krater") – this is now at the National Archaeological Museum of Cerveteri; it was at the Villa Giulia from 2008 to 2014

== Gallery ==
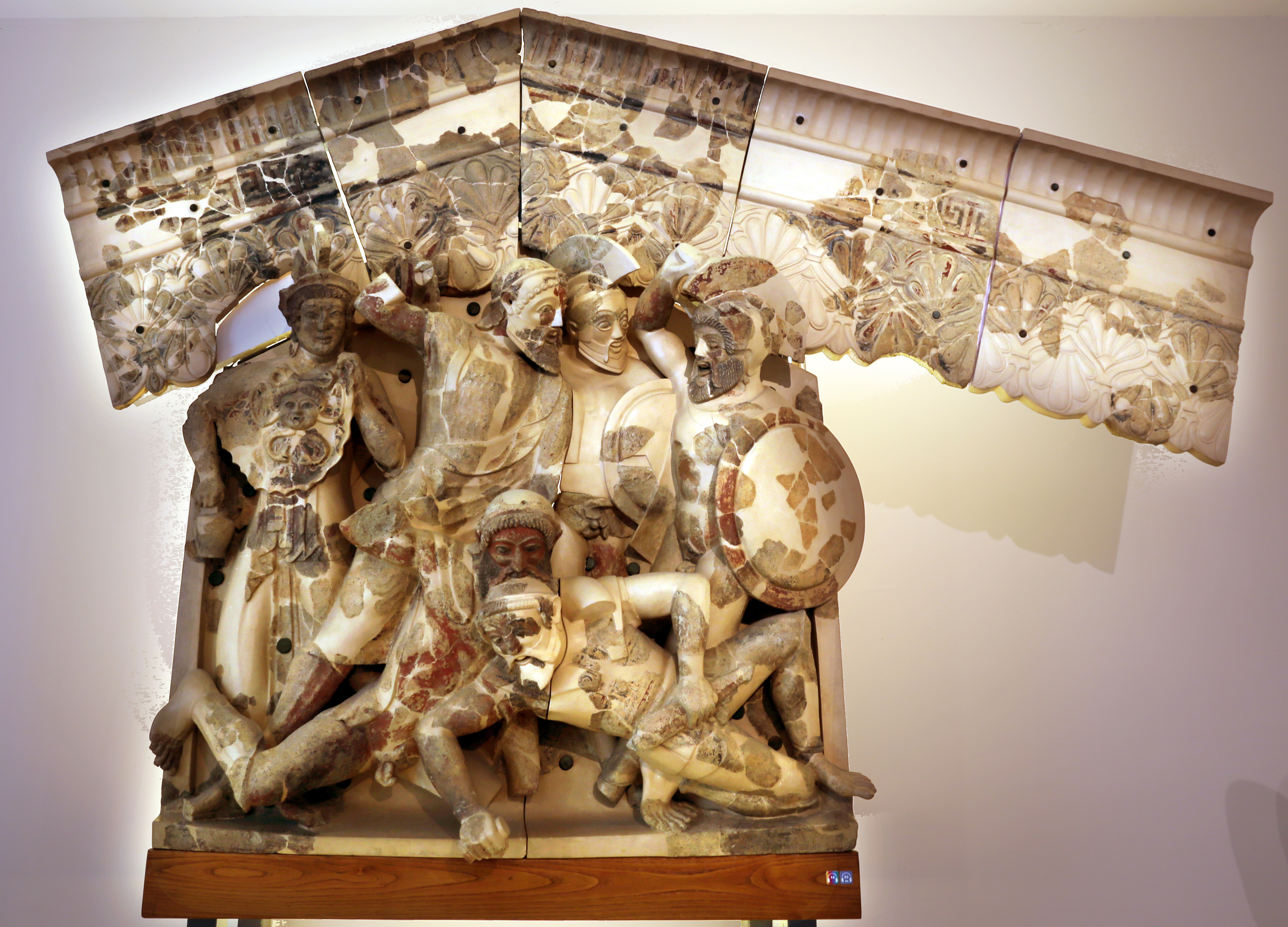
Pediment relief of Temple A at Pyrgi, depicting scenes from the Theban Cycle, c. 470–460 BCE

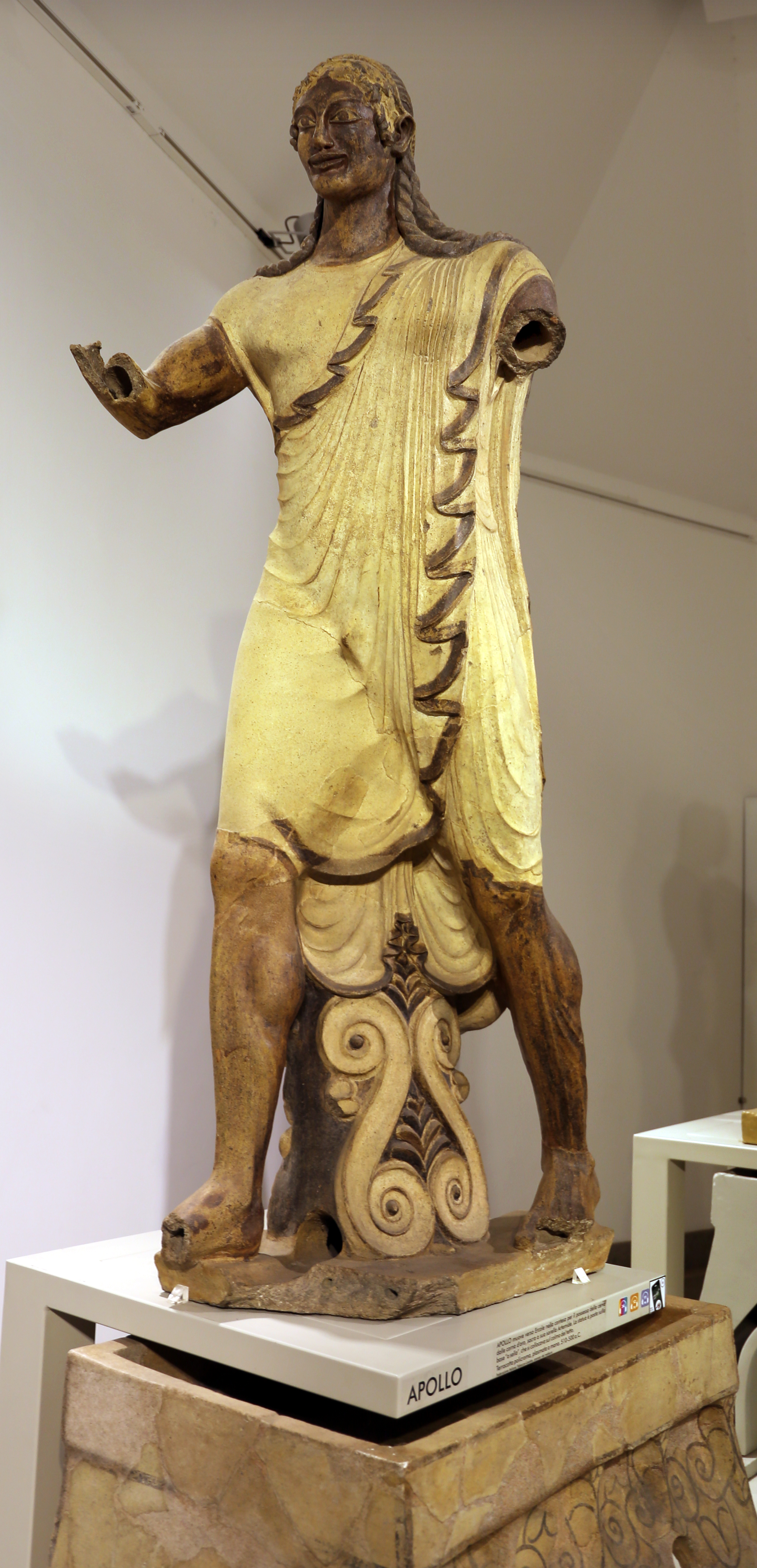
Apollo of Veii, c. 510–500 BCE

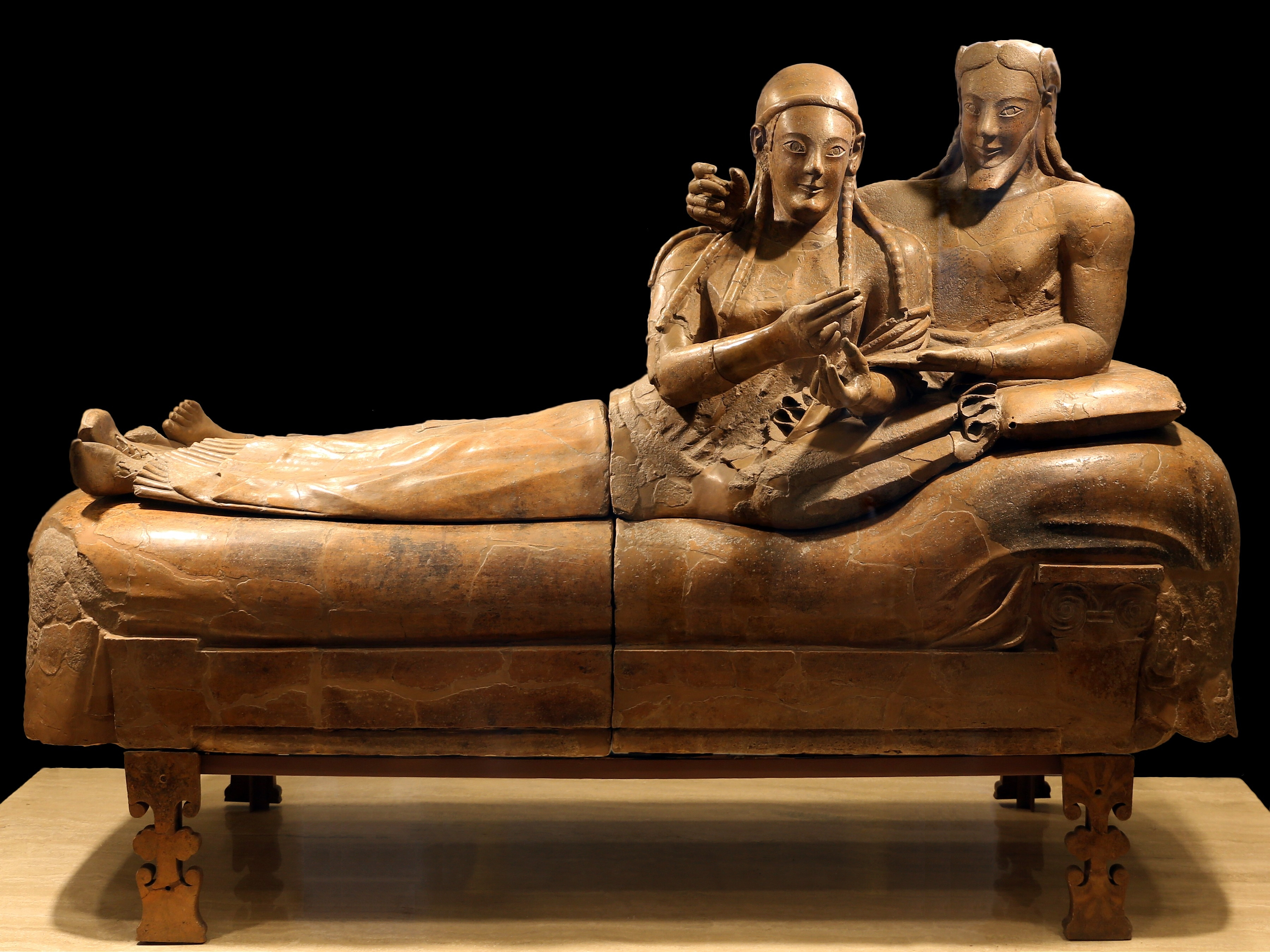
Sarcophagus of the Spouses, c. 530–510 BCE

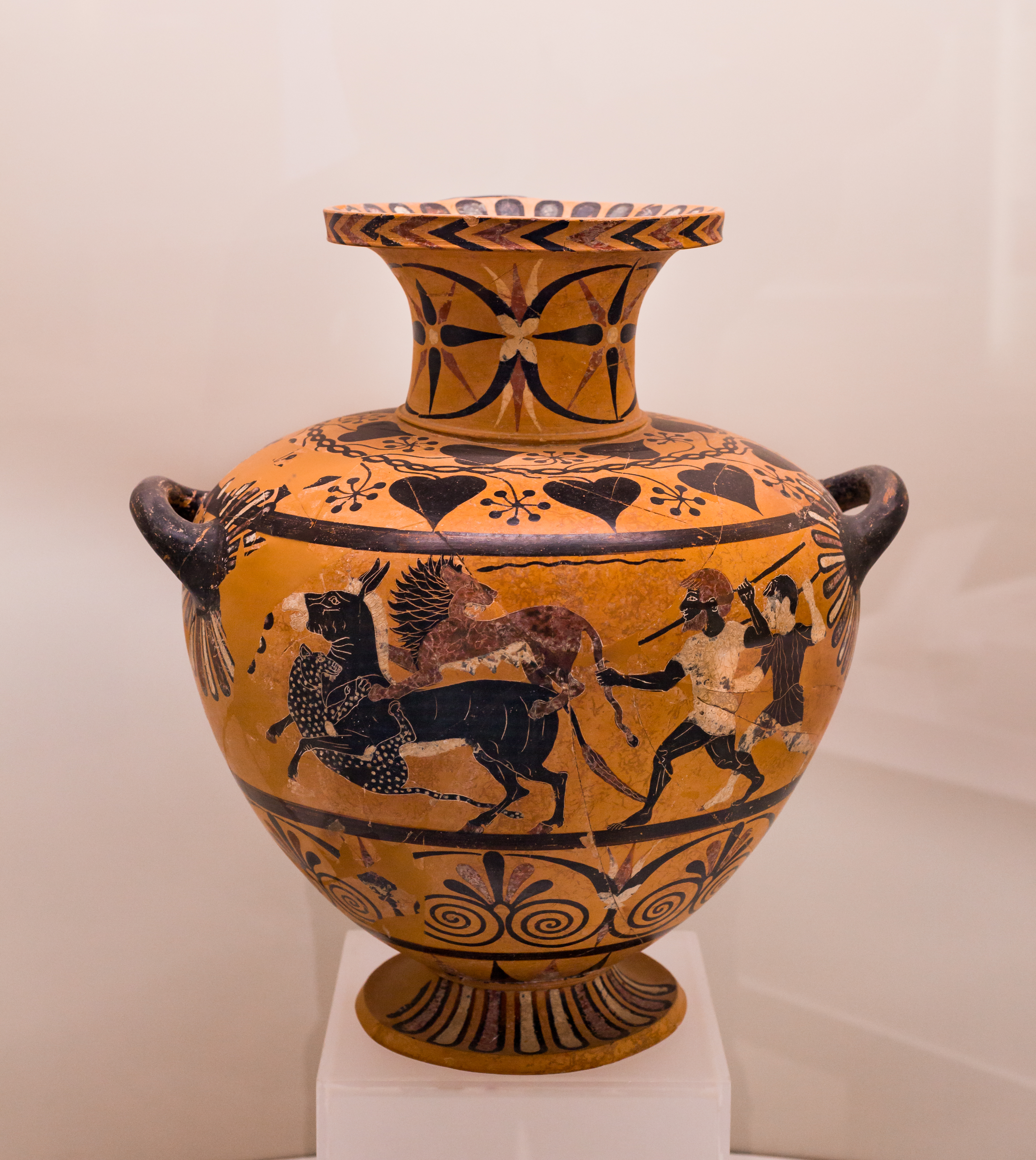
Caeretan hydria, c. 530–500 BCE, found in Cerveteri

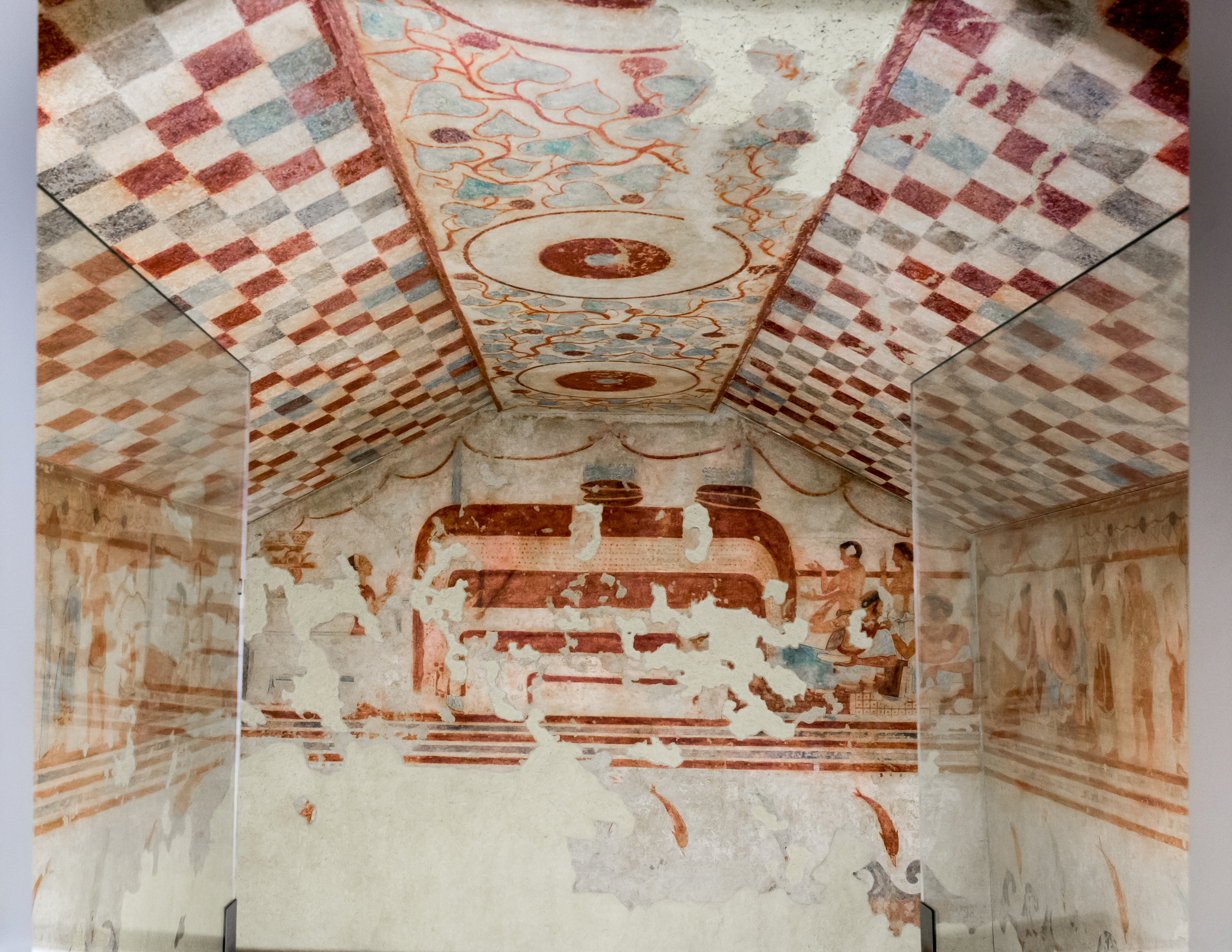
Wall paintings from a tomb in Tarquinia, c. 460–450 BCE

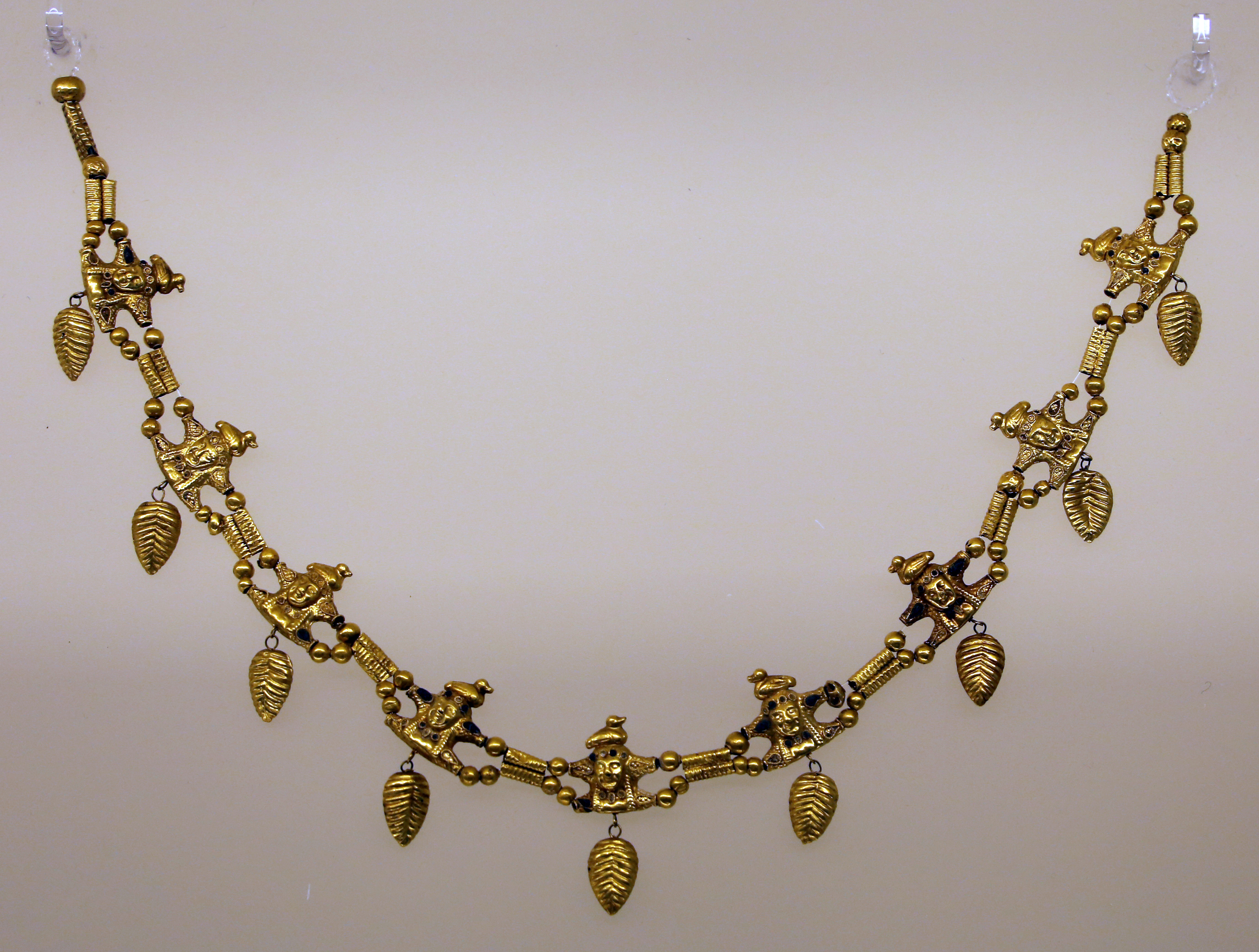
Etruscan netcklace with pinecone pendants, c. 6th century BCE

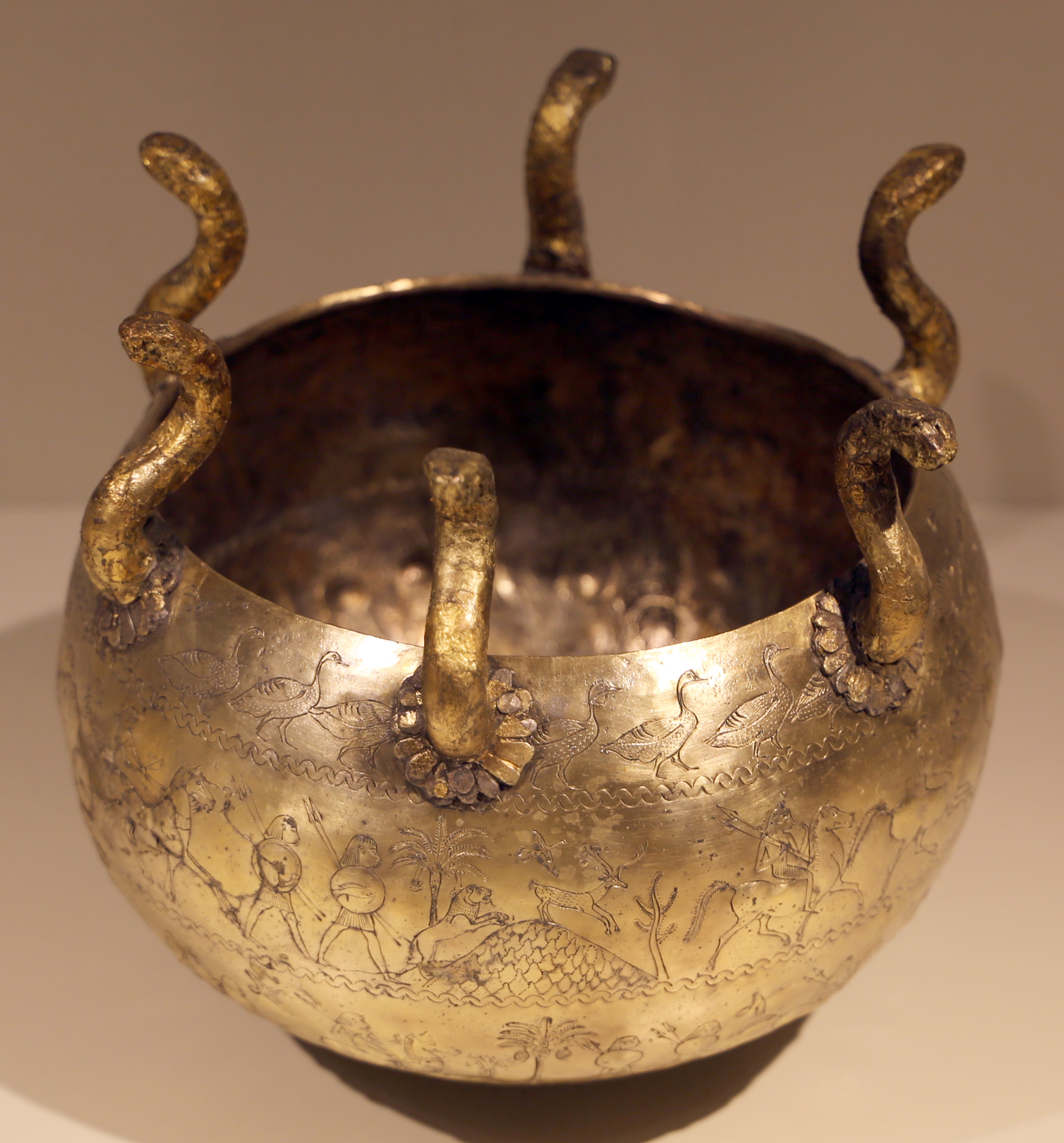
Lebes with snake heads, c. 675–650 BCE, from Palestrina

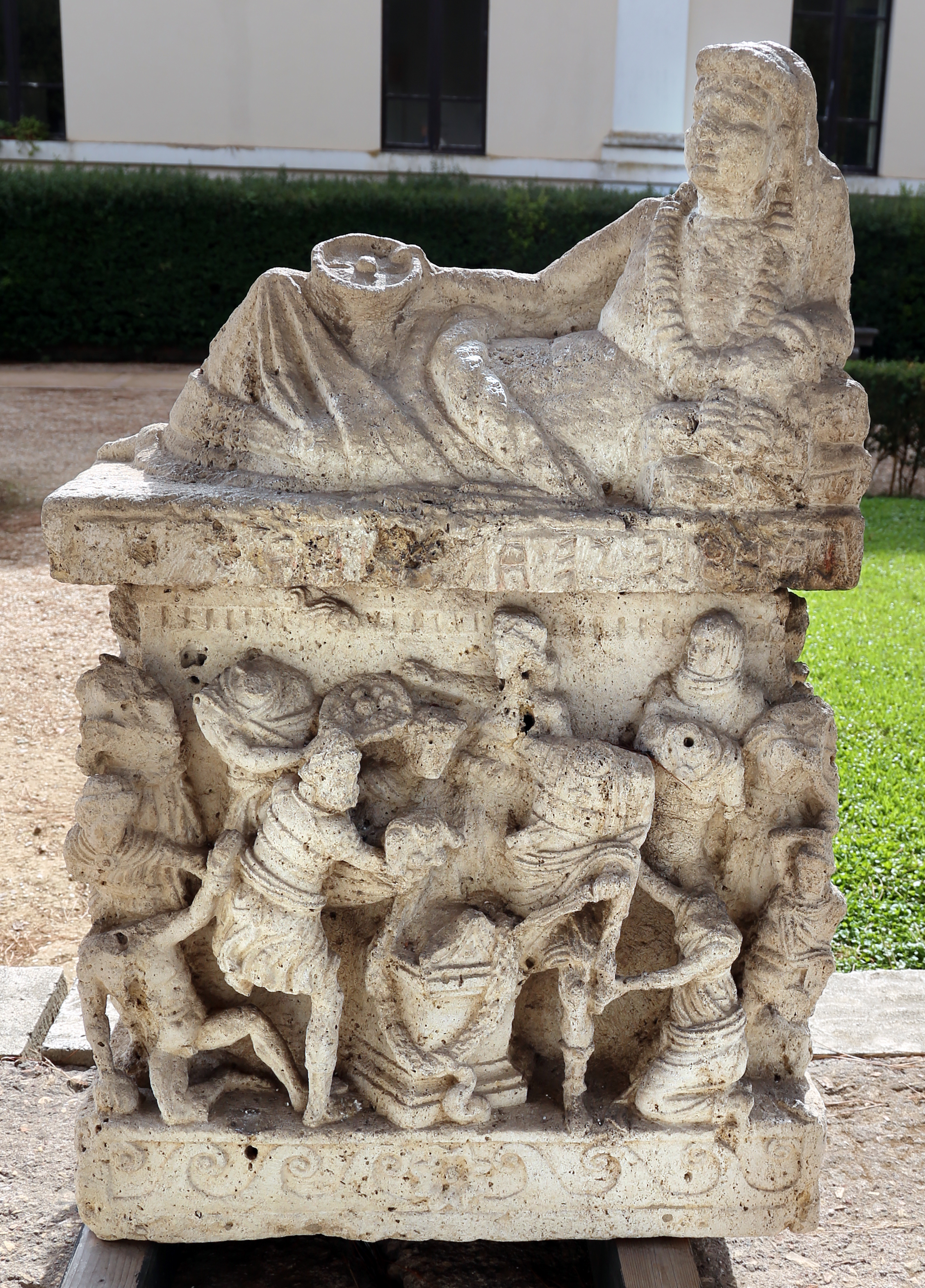
Urn depicting Telephus abducting Orestes, c. 3rd–2nd century BCE, found in Umbria

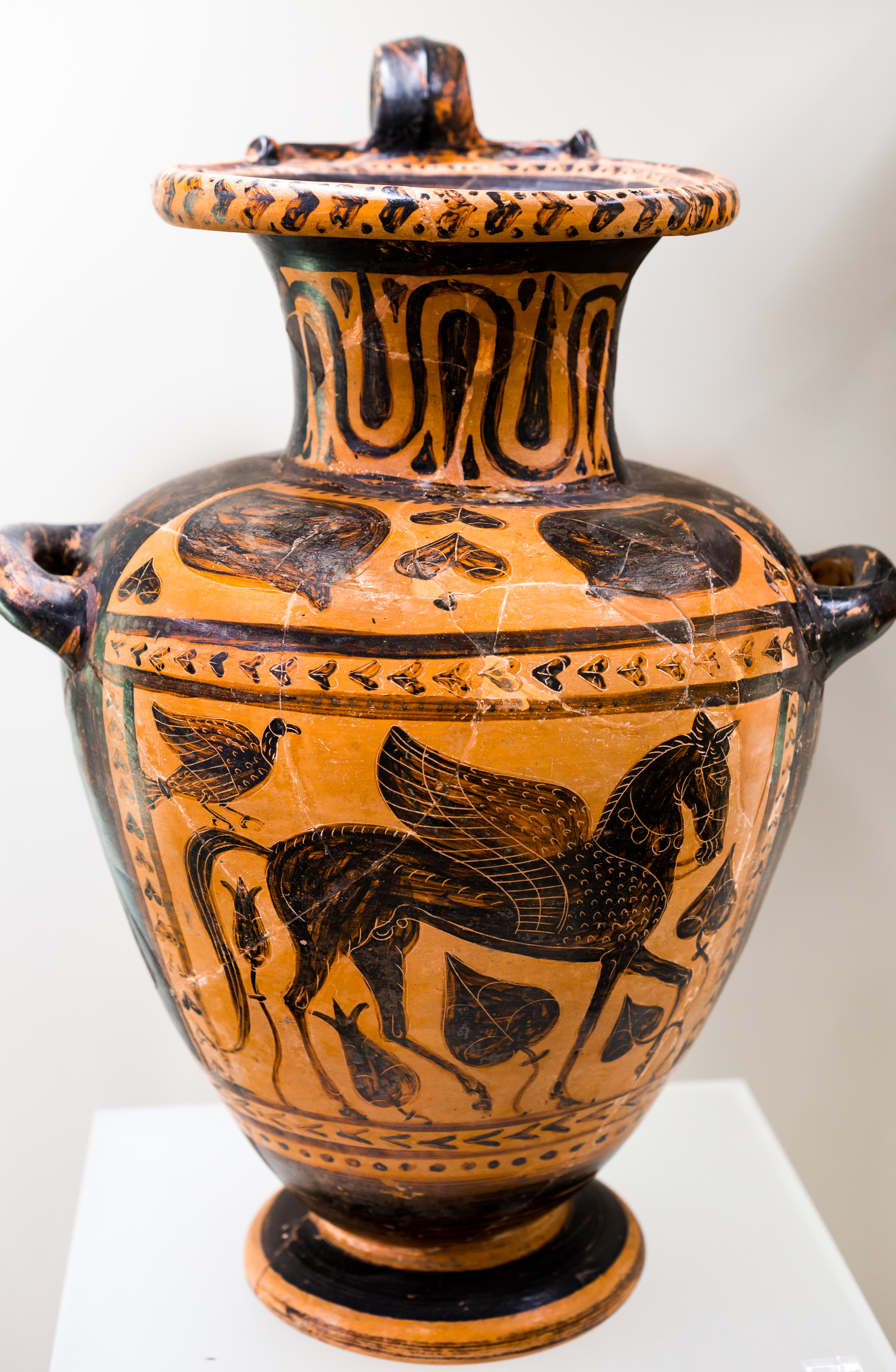
Etruscan black-figure hydra depicting a winged horse, c. 520–500 BCE, found at Vulci, attributed to the Micali Painter

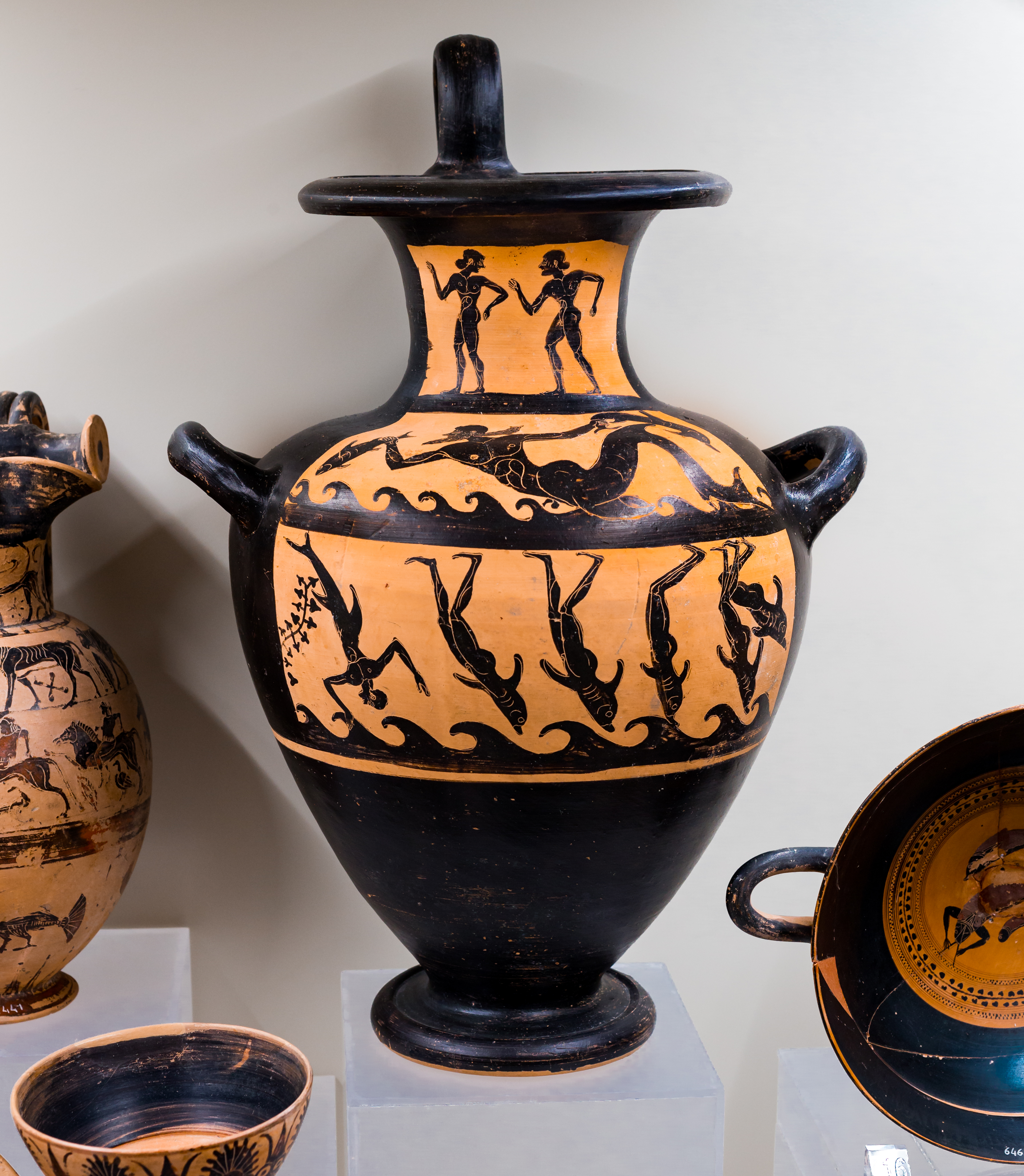
Etruscan black-figure hydria depicting Triton, c. 510–500 BCE, found in Vulci, attributed to the Painter of Vatican 238 (Kaineus Painter)

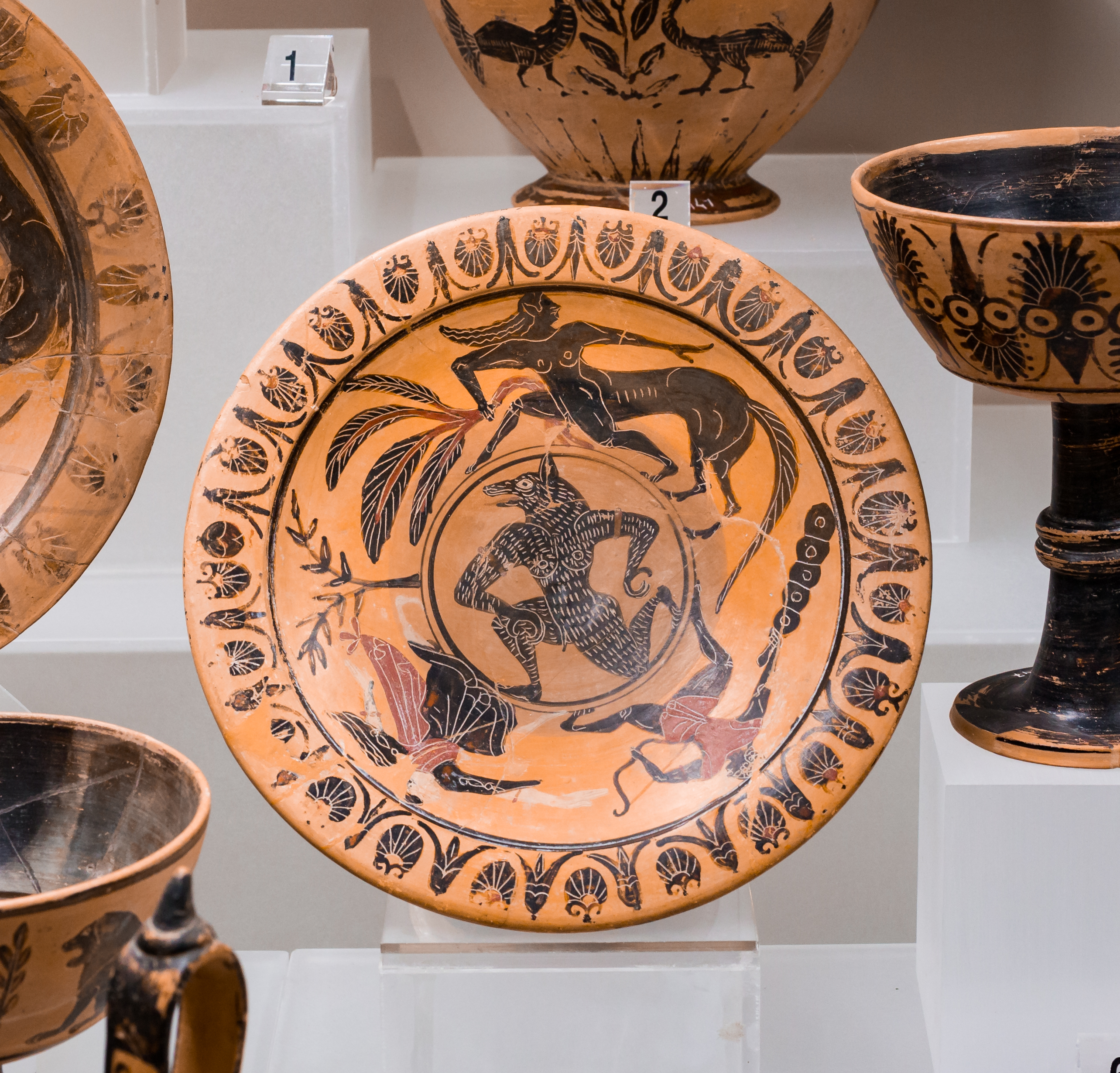
Etruscan black-figure footed plate depicting a hairy daimon in Knielauf, c. 520 BCE, found in Vulci, attributed to the Tityos Painter

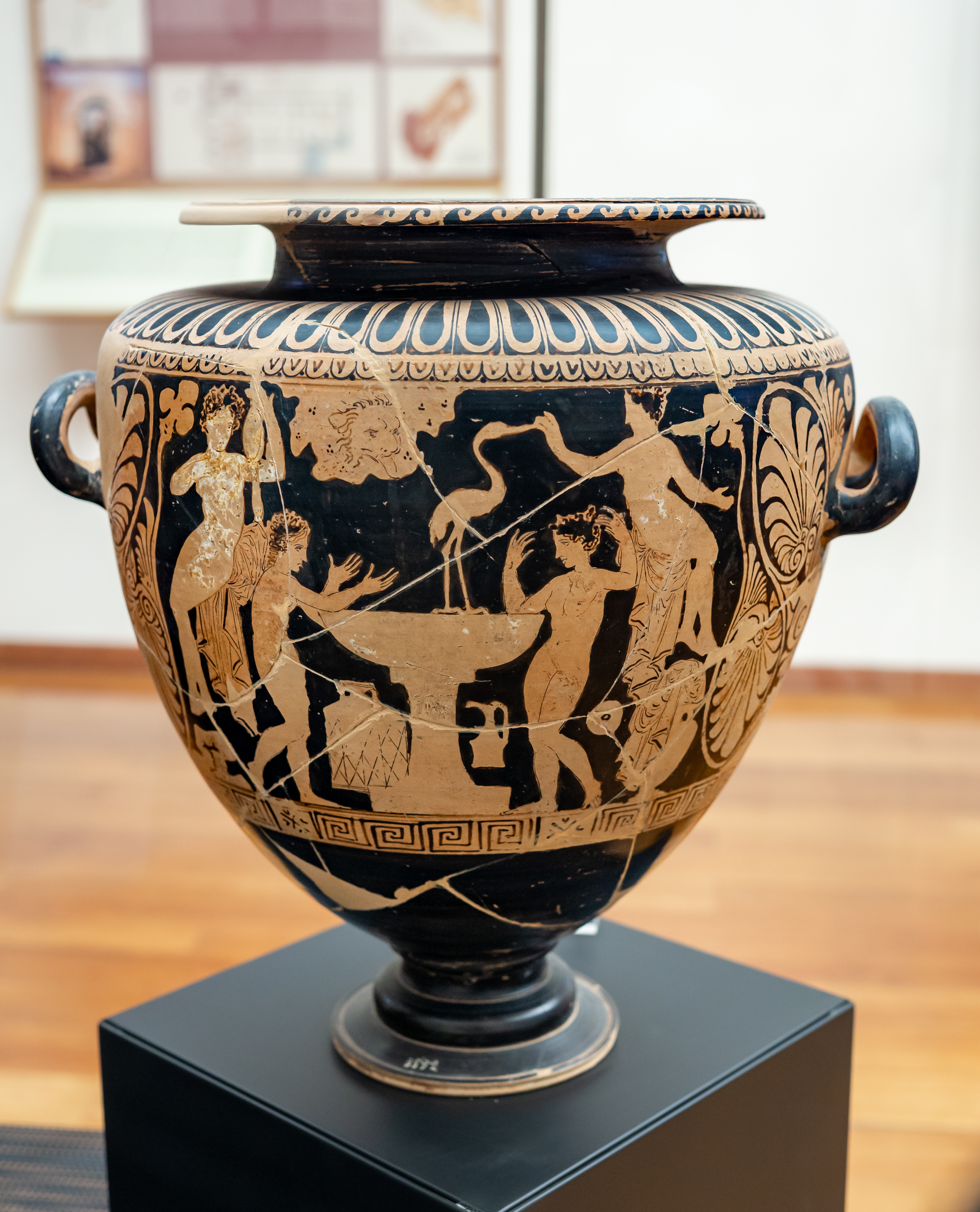
Etruscan red-figure stamnos depicting women at the perirrhanterion, c. 375–350 BCE, found in Falerii Veteres, attributed to the Aurora Painter

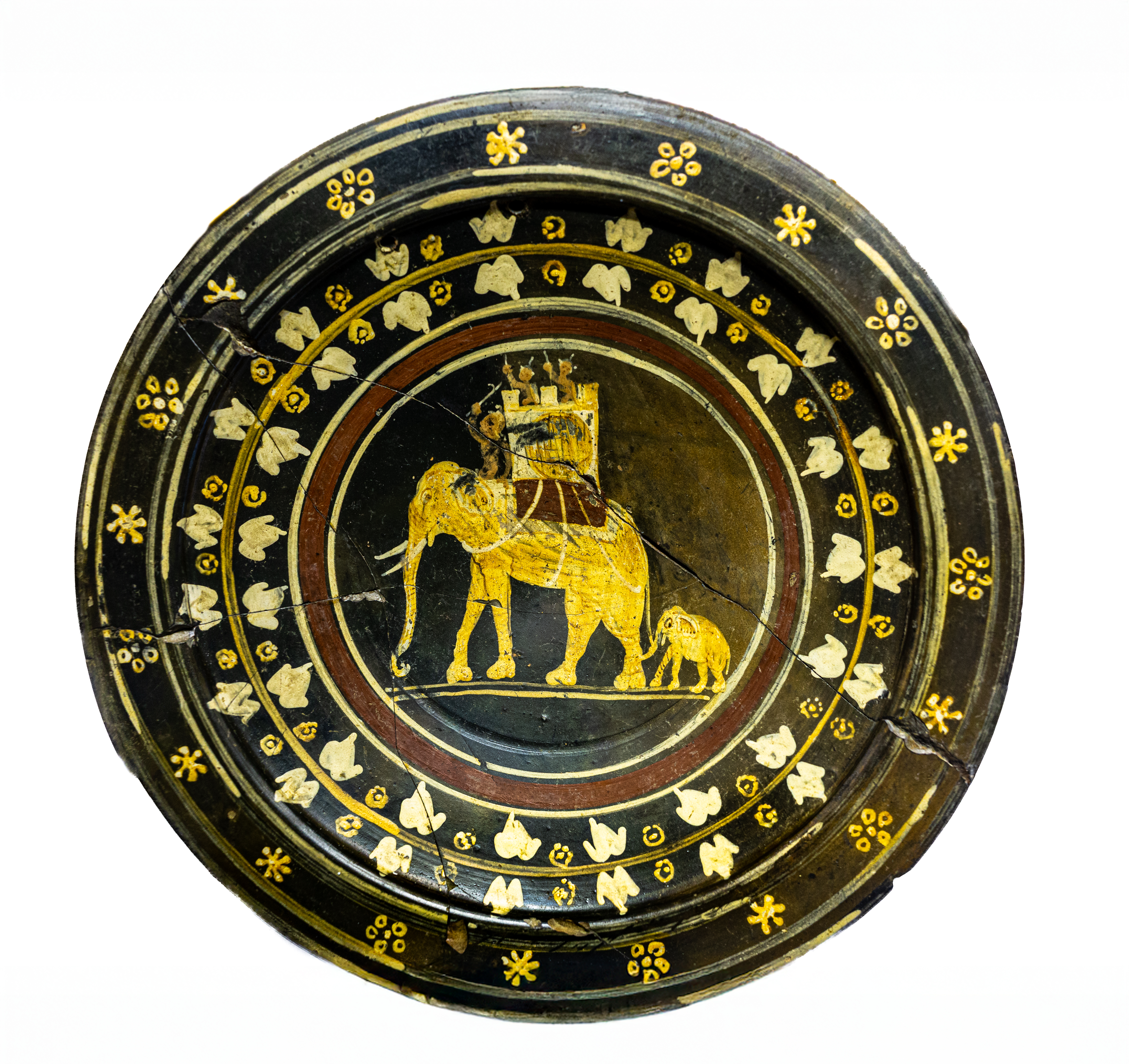
Etruscan plate depicting a war elephant, c. 280–260 BCE, found in Capena

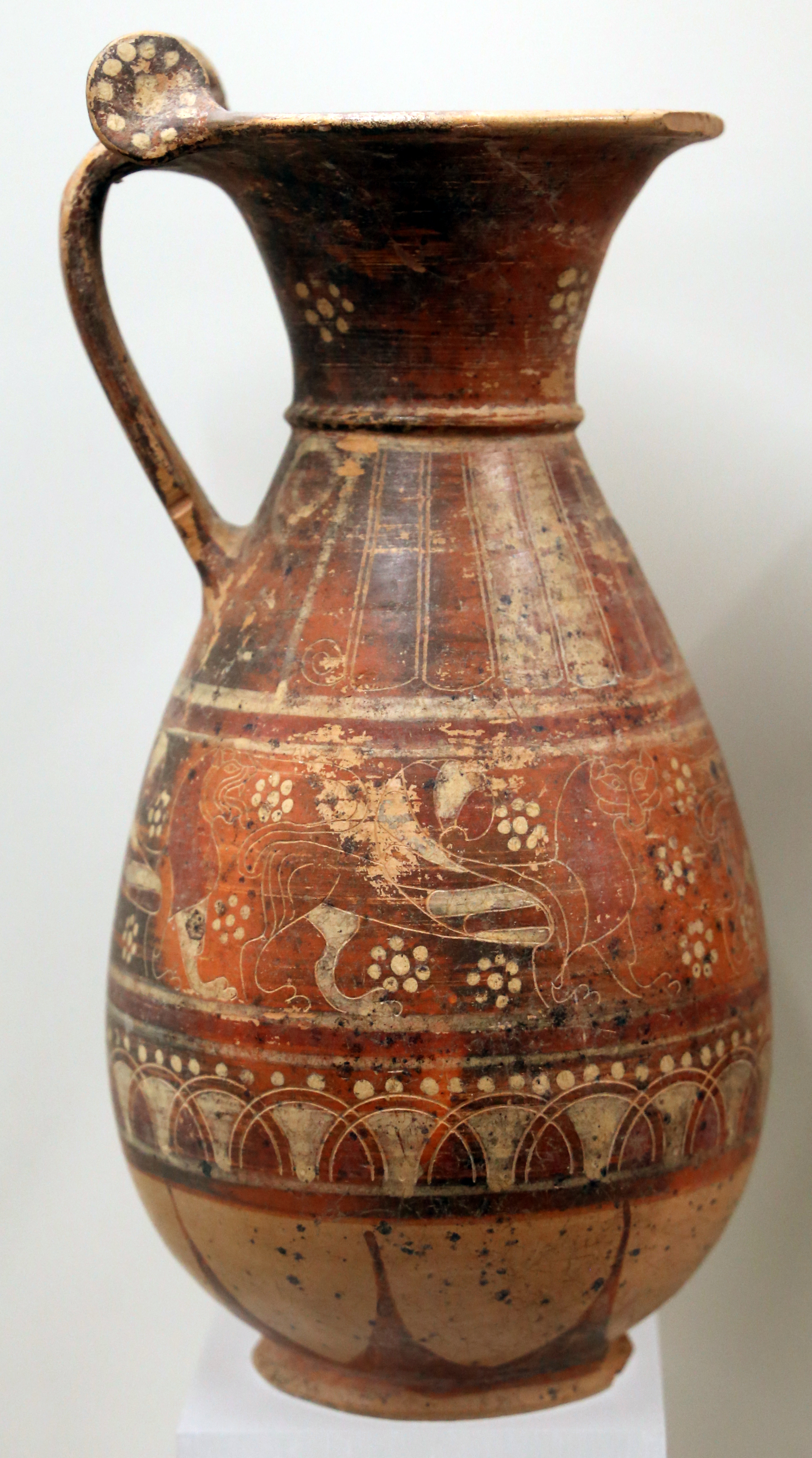
Etrusco-Corinthian oenochoe, c. 630–620 BCE, produced in Vulci and attributed to the Painter of the Polychrome Arches

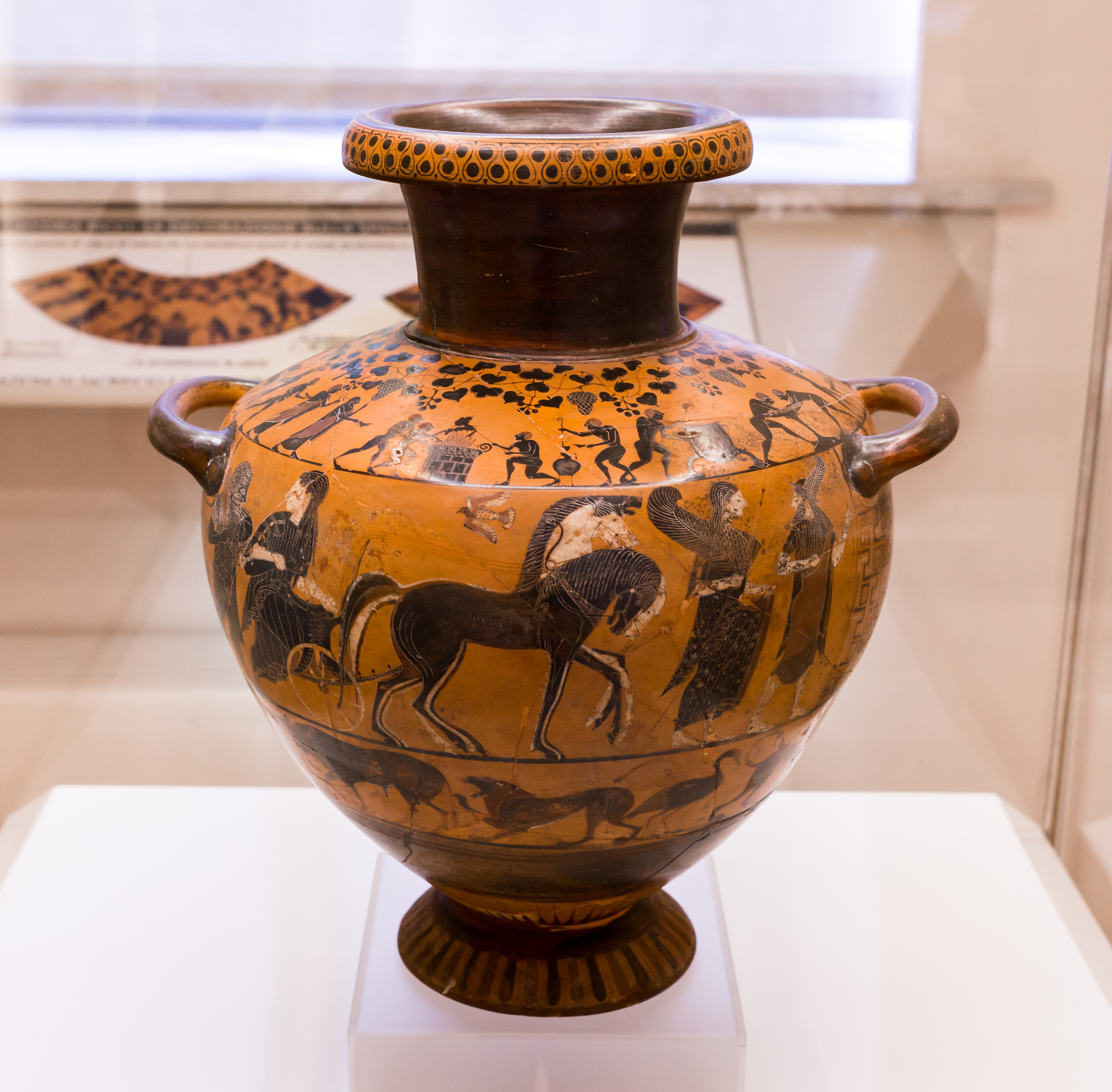
Greek black-figure hydria depicting a sacrifice to Dionysus, c. 530 BCE, found in Cerveteri, attributed to the Ribbon Painter

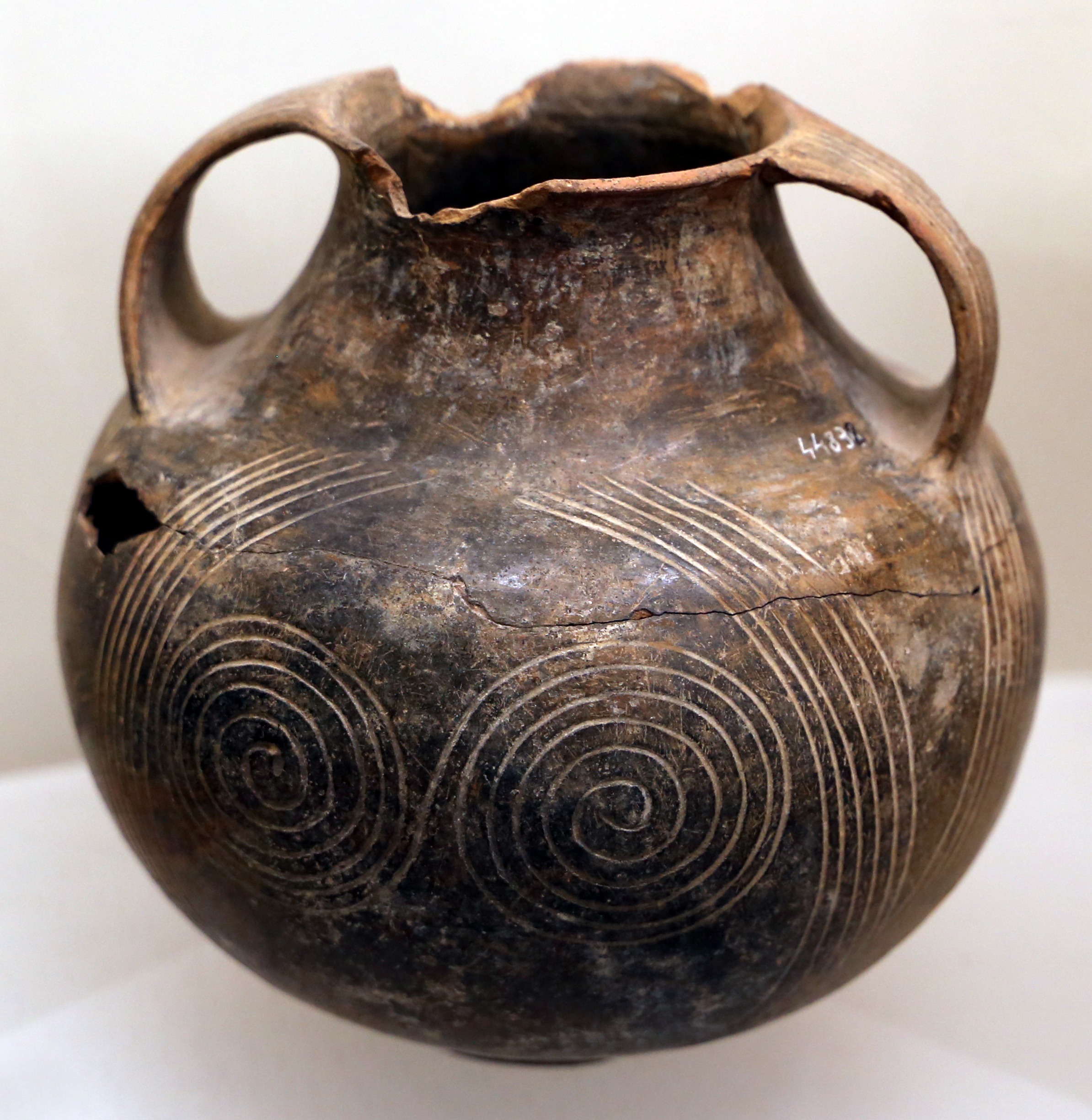
Amphora, c. 700–670 BCE, found in Cerveteri

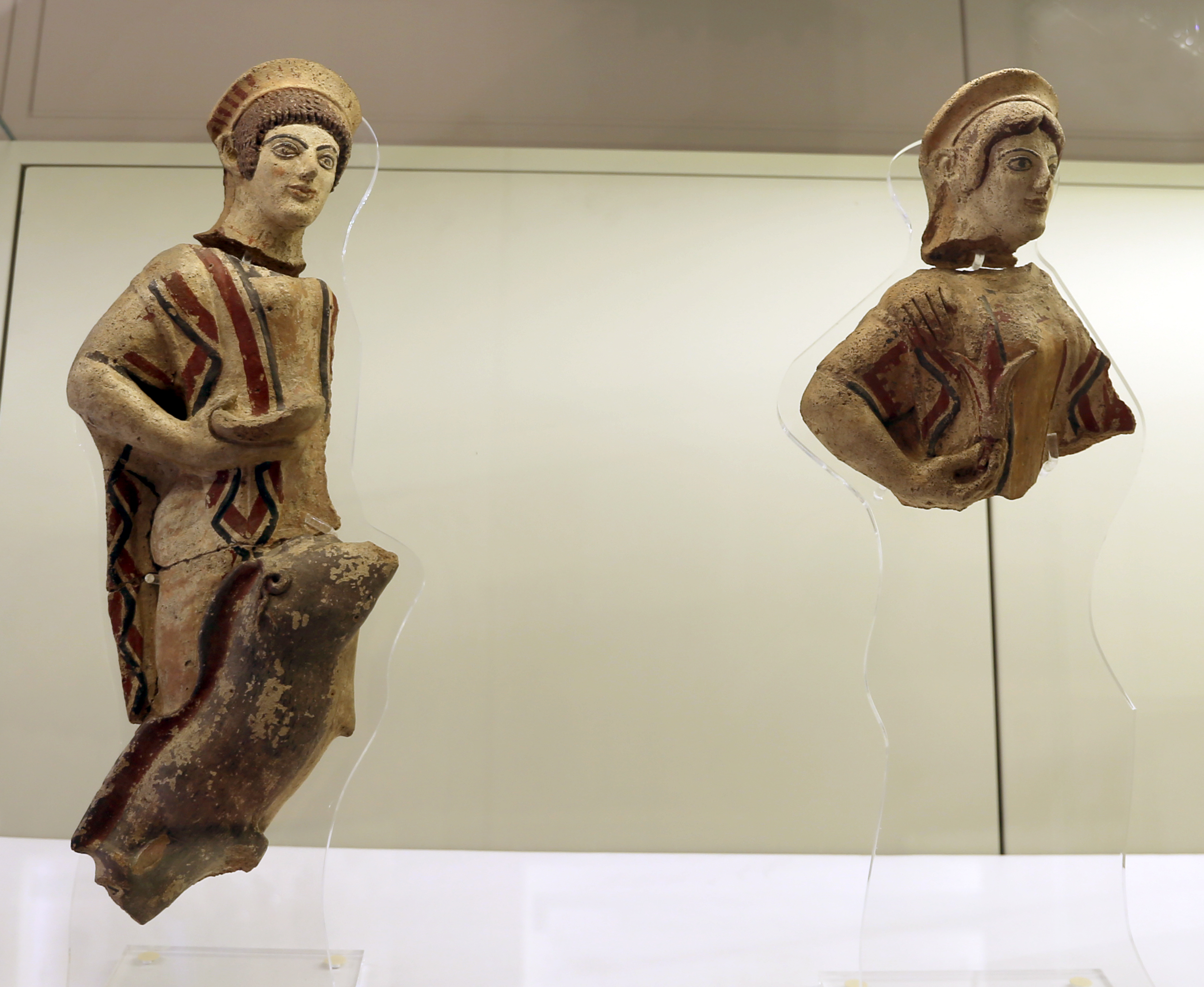
Antefixes from the Sanctuary of the Fallen Stones (Sassi Caduti) in Falerii, c. 4th century BCE

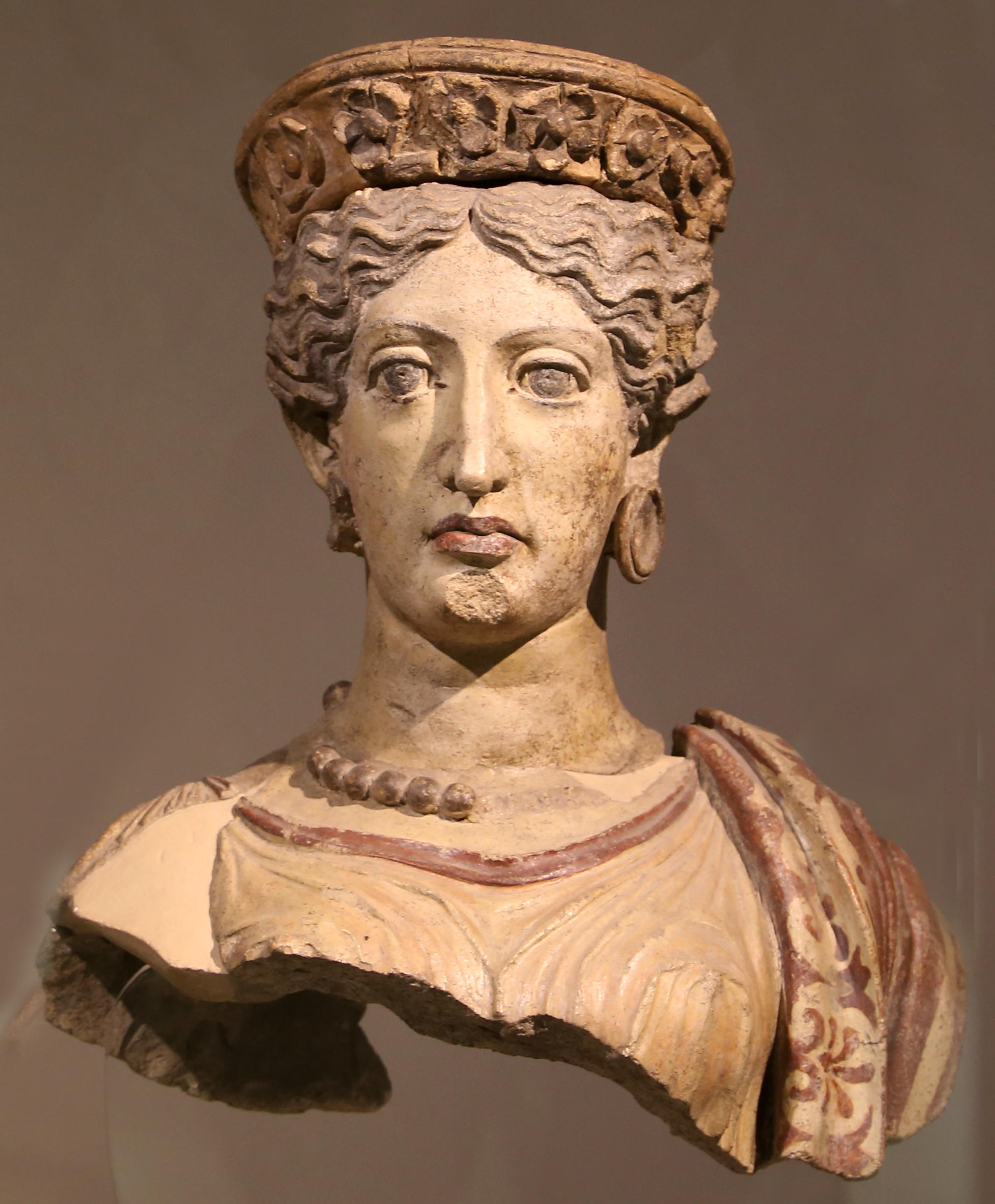
Bust of Juno from the Temple of Celle in Falerii, c. 380 BCE

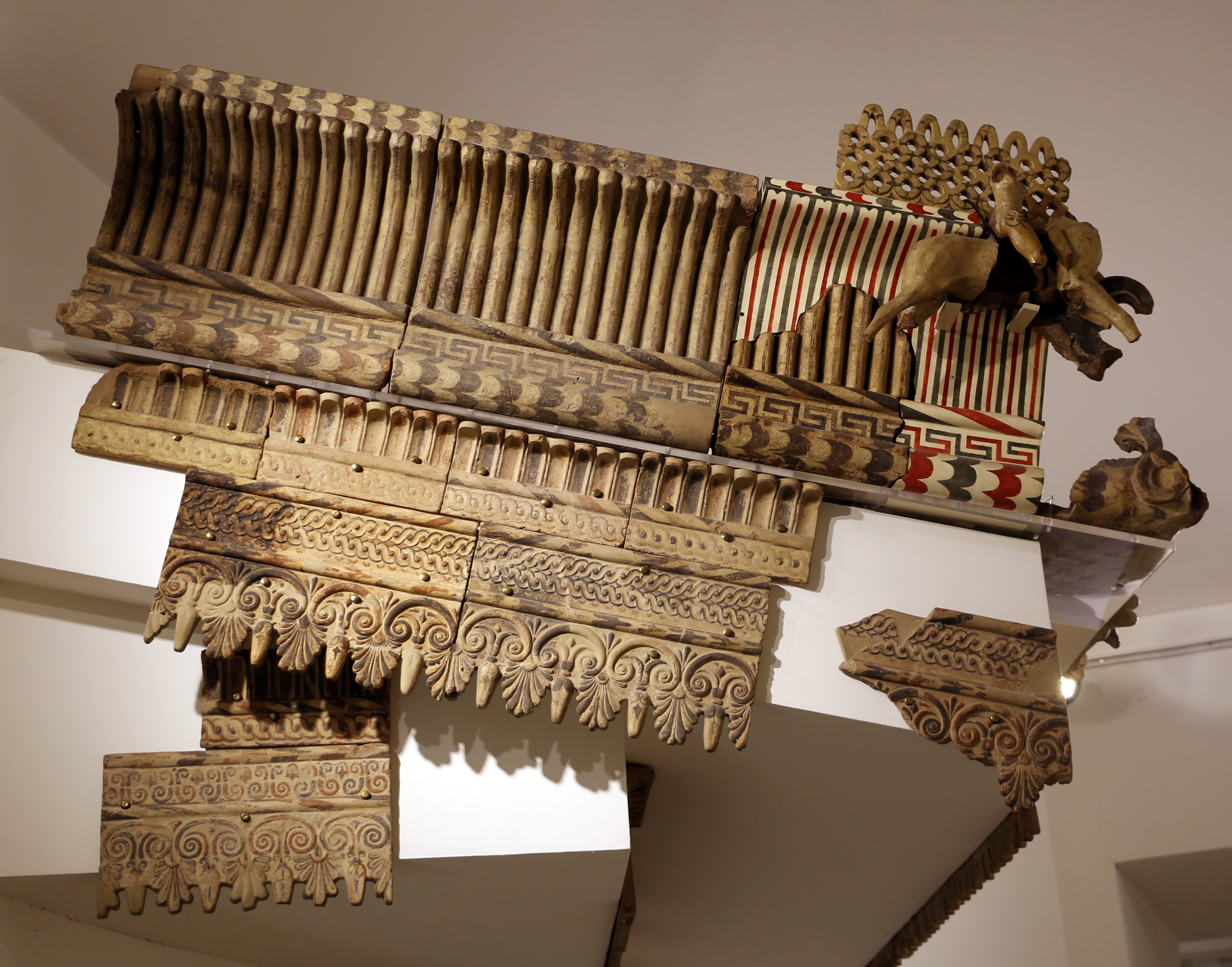
Decoration from the Sanctuary of Minerva, Portonaccio, c. 510–500 BCE

== See also ==
- Tarquinia National Museum
- National Archaeological Museum of Cerveteri
- Museo Etrusco Guarnacci
- Museo dell'Accademia Etrusca

Preceded by Museo nazionale del Palazzo di Venezia	Landmarks of Rome; National Etruscan Museum	Succeeded by Museo Nazionale Romano
