= Wilmington Friends School =

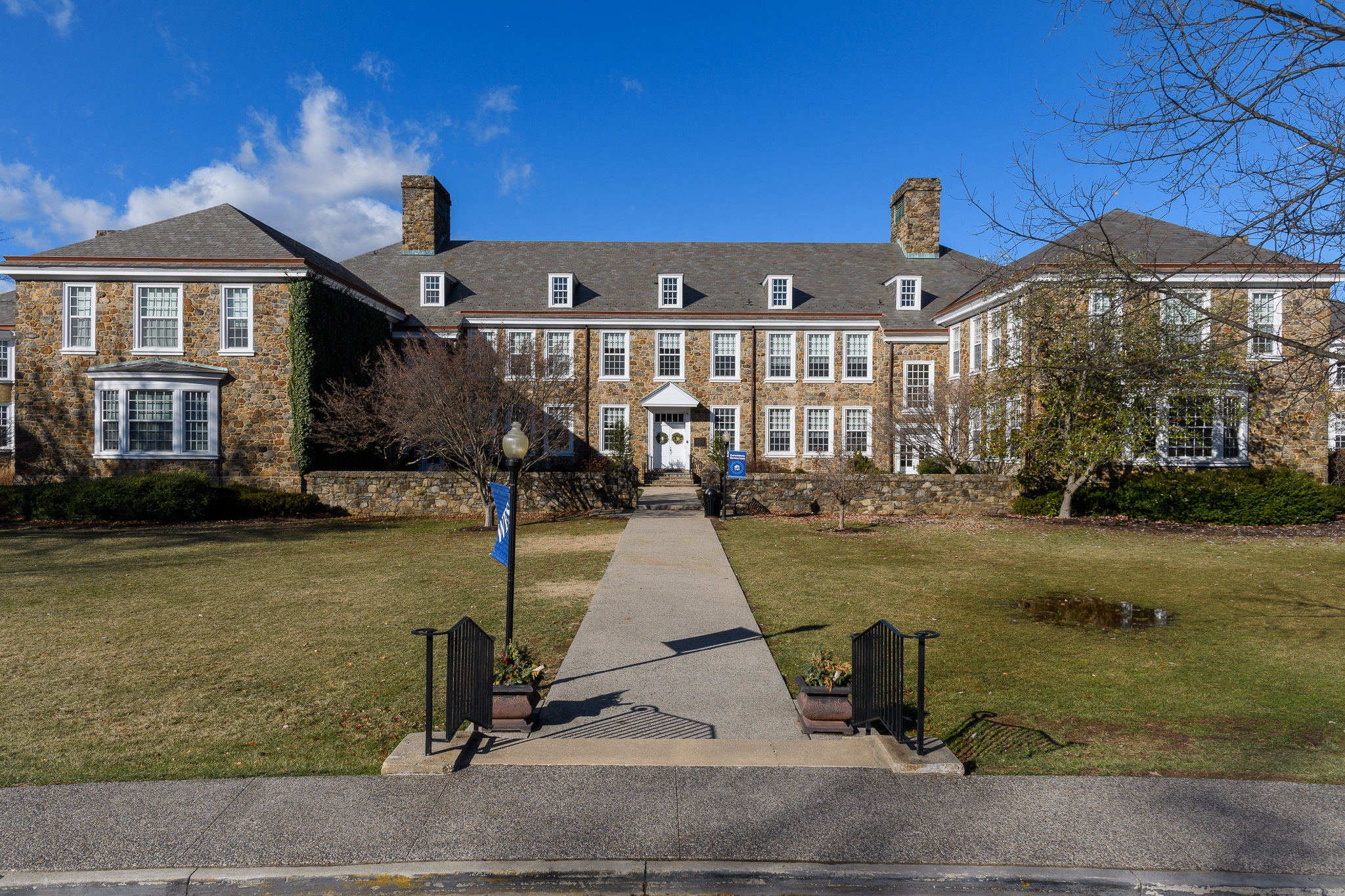

Location
- 101 School Road; Wilmington, Delaware 19803; United States; 39°46′07″N 75°33′02″W

Information
- Type: Private school
- Religious affiliation: Society of Friends
- Established: 1748 (278 years ago)
- CEEB code: 080160
- Head of school: Kenneth E. Aldridge
- Teaching staff: 74.1 (on an FTE basis)
- Grades: Preschool - 12
- Enrollment: 694 (includes 46 PK students) (2017-18)
- Student to teacher ratio: 8.7
- Website: www.wilmingtonfriends.org

Wilmington Friends School is a private Preschool-12 school in unincorporated New Castle County, Delaware, United States, near Wilmington. It is affiliated with the Society of Friends, also known as the Quakers.

== History ==
The school was founded in 1748 by members of the Wilmington Monthly Meeting of Friends.

Of the school, Delaware historian Benjamin Ferris wrote in the 19th century, "Thousands of children have there received the first rudiments of an English education."

In 1937, the Friends School moved from its original site to its current location in Alapocas, just outside the city of Wilmington. In 2019, it was announced that the school was selling its lower school building and constructing a new lower school on the middle and upper school campus. The community surrounding the school had an opposing viewpoint however and after years of push back and a denied request to alter variances, plans for the sale were cancelled. Wilmington Friends is now planning a significant remodel and expansion to the lower school, which will remain intact at its current location.

== Notable alumni ==
- Ashley Biden, American social worker, activist, philanthropist, and fashion designer
- Adam B. Ellick, correspondent for The New York Times who filmed a documentary about Malala Yousafza
- Linda Holmes, NPR personality and writer
- Matt Meyer, Delaware's 76th Governor (took office January 2025)
- Crystal Nix-Hines, United States Ambassador to UNESCO
- Daniel Pfeiffer, politician and podcaster
- Carol Quillen, president of Davidson College
- Stephen Urice - (1950) Archeologist, Law professor, cultural property law
- Mabel Vernon, American suffragist, pacifist, and a national leader in the United States suffrage movement
