= Wayne Kimmel =

American investor (born 1970)

- Born: April 30, 1970 (age 56); Wilmington, Delaware, U.S.
- Education: University of Maryland; Widener University Delaware Law School
- Spouse: Kimby Kimmel
- Parent(s): Morton Kimmel, Marcia Kimmel

Wayne Kimmel (born April 30, 1970) is an American venture capitalist, investor and author. He is the founder and Managing Partner of SeventySix Capital.

Philadelphia Magazine named Kimmel one of Philadelphia's "Top Innovators." The Sports Business Journal named Kimmel a Sports Tech Power Player in 2022 and he was also awarded the 2022 Most Admired CEO award from the Philadelphia Business Journal.

== Early life and education ==
Kimmel was born in Wilmington, Delaware and attended The Tatnall School. Kimmel attended the University of Maryland where he was a broadcaster for their football and basketball teams.

== Career ==
Kimmel got his start as a venture capitalist working for Pete Musser at Safeguard Scientifics. Kimmel moved onto Safeguard's campus in Wayne, Pennsylvania and created a venture capital fund that was connected to Safeguard. Musser then challenged Kimmel to raise $9 million to work with, but Kimmel ended up raising $19 million.

=== SeventySix Capital ===
In 1999, Kimmel founded SeventySix Capital, which invested in startups relating to sports, esports, sports betting and tech. SeventySix Capital has invested in many successful startups including Vegas Stats & Information Network, Whistle Sports Network, Indiegogo and Nutrisystem. Investors in SeventySix Capital include Pittsburgh Pirates owner Bob Nutting, Fanatics CEO Michael G. Rubin, and Arthur Blank, Chairman of AMB Group LLC, parent company of the Atlanta Falcons and Atlanta United. In total, SeventySix Capital’s portfolio companies have raised more than $5 billion.

Notable athletes including Ryan Howard, Brian Westbrook, Emmanuel Sanders, Ralph Sampson and DeMarco Murray are all part of SeventySix Capital's Athlete Venture Group, which provides athletes with opportunities to invest and become entrepreneurs.

Kimmel also founded SeventySix Capital's Sports Advisory Group, a sports consulting business.

=== Author ===
Kimmel is a published author. He authored a book titled, Six Degrees of Wayne Kimmel. The book centers around his career as a venture capitalist and offers advice for entrepreneurs.

== Personal life ==
Kimmel is Jewish. He lives in Gladwyne, Pennsylvania with his wife, Kimby and his two kids.

Kimmel served as the treasurer and a board member of the Jewish Federation of Greater Philadelphia and sits on the board of trustees of the Jewish Federations of North America. He also serves as a board member and the chairman of the development committee at the Einstein Healthcare Network.

His father, Morton, was a notable lawyer based in Wilmington. Kimmel has two sisters, Michelle and Karen, and brother, Larry, an attorney and Managing Partner at Kimmel Carter.
