= Tatnall School =

Prep school in Wilmington, Delaware, US

The Tatnall School

Location
- 1501 Barley Mill Rd; Wilmington, Delaware 19807; United States; 39°46′07″N 75°37′02″W

Information
- Type: Nonprofit, college-prep day school
- Motto: Omnia in Caritate (All things in love)
- Established: 1930 (96 years ago)
- Founder: Frances D. S. Tatnall
- CEEB code: 080200
- Head of school: Alli Williams, Ed.D.
- Grades: PK2–12
- Enrollment: Grades PK2 through Grade 12 (600 combined gender)
- Campus size: 110 acres
- Colors: Black and gold
- Athletics: The Hornets
- Mascot: Hornet
- Accreditation: Middle States
- Yearbook: The Triangle
- Website: www.tatnall.org

The Tatnall School is a private college-preparatory school in unincorporated New Castle County, Delaware; it has a Wilmington postal address and is adjacent to, but not in, the Greenville census-designated place.

The school is for students from two years old through 12th grade. The school was founded as an all-girls school in 1930 by Frances Dorr Swift Tatnall at her home in downtown Wilmington, Delaware, and moved to its current location in 1952. Tatnall began to admit boys in 1952 (the class of 1964). The school's mascot is the hornet. Its motto is "Omnia in caritate", which means all things in love.

== Accreditation ==
- Middle States Association of Colleges and Schools

== Arts ==
Tatnall offers a variety of visual and performing arts programs, including photography, drawing, instrumental and vocal performance. In September 2007, Tatnall opened its 23,000 square foot Laird Performing Arts Center. The center boasts a 471-seat theater. Here, the Tatnall arts program puts on its annual showcase and performance by the advanced theater class, now in its 48th year. One former notable instructor is Wilson Somers, who is also a composer and performer; Somers was also a recipient of an Emmy award in 2000. Students at the school are required to participate in art programs, and have won numerous state awards throughout the years.

== 2008 election ==
Tatnall was a Delaware polling booth in the 2008 United States presidential election. Senator Joe Biden (a native Pennsylvanian but Delaware resident since 1953), who lives near the school, cast his vote in Tatnall's main lobby in that election cycle. Some of Joe Biden's grandchildren attended the school.

== Notable alumni ==
- Zach Baylin - American Screenwriter
- Scott Beale - Associate Director for Global Operations at Peace Corps
- Jake Bergey - American Lacrosse Player
- Timothy Huang - Playwright, actor, composer and lyricist
- Wayne Kimmel - American venture capitalist
- Margaret H. Marshall - 24th chief justice of the Massachusetts Supreme Judicial Court
- Miriam E. Nelson - New York Times bestselling Author
- Hallie Olivere Biden - School counselor and wife of Beau Biden
- Sam Parsons - Professional runner for Adidas
- Mick Purzycki - CEO of Jerry Media
- Stephen Urice - (1950) Archeologist, Law professor, cultural property law
- Ti West - American horror film director
