= National Archaeological Museum of Cerveteri =

Museum in Cerveteri, Italy

- Museo nazionale cerite "Claudia Ruspoli"
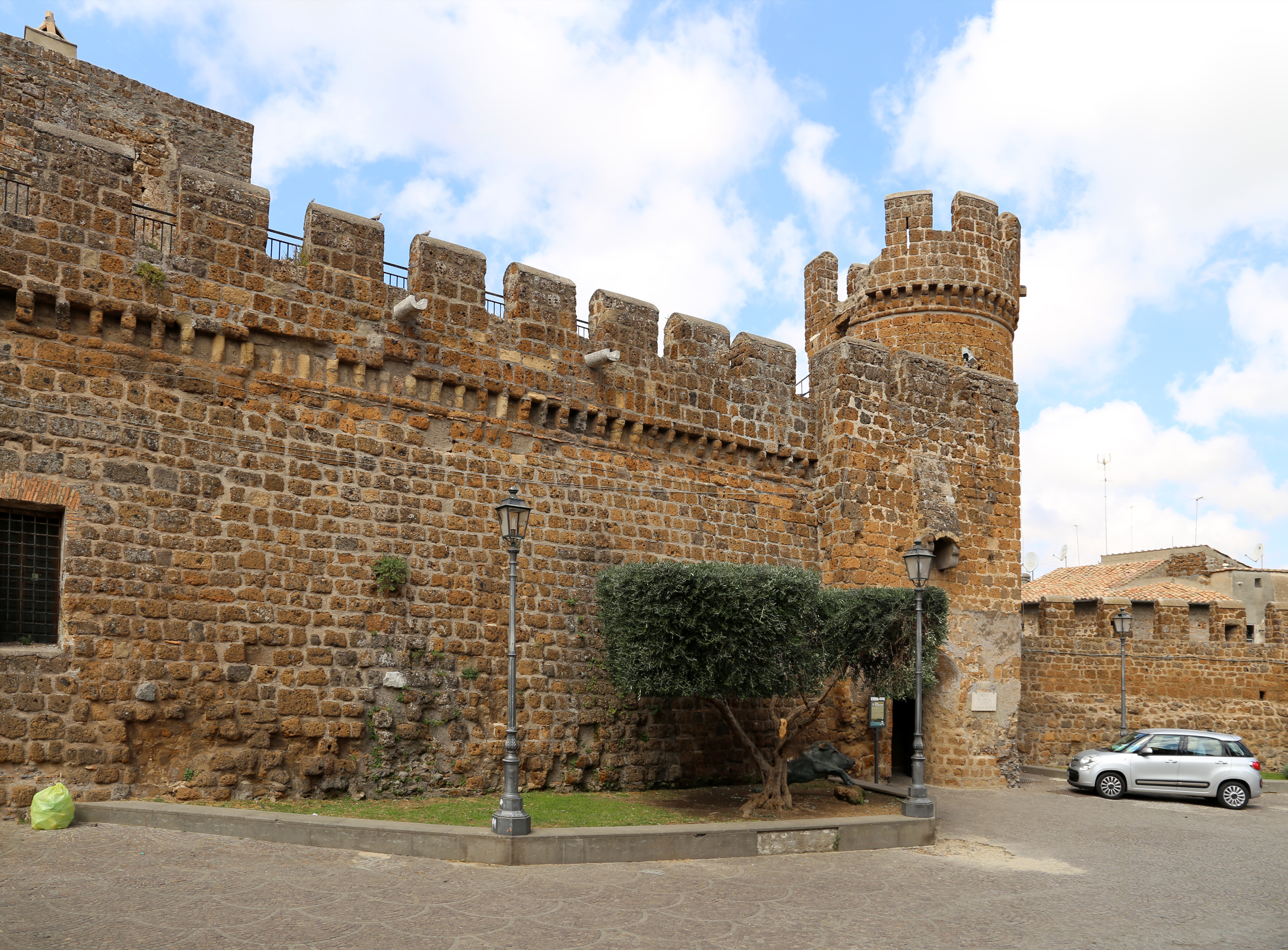
- Ruspoli Castle, home to the museum
- Established: 1967
- Location: Piazza S. Maria 1, Cerveteri, Italy
- Coordinates: 41°59′55.03″N 12°05′58.06″E
- Type: Archaeology
- Visitors: 2015: 19,015
- Executive director: Maria Paola Guidobaldi
- Owner: Ministry of Culture (Italy)
- Website: http://www.cerveteri.beniculturali.it/index.php?it/175/il-museo-nazionale-cerite

The National Archaeological Museum of Cerveteri (also known as the National Museum of Cerveteri (Italian: Museo Nazionale Cerite) or the Archaeological Museum of Cerveteri) is the archaeological museum of the city of Cerveteri, in the Metropolitan City of Rome Capital area in northern Lazio. It is dedicated to Etruscan art, primarily from the necropolises of the ancient Etruscan city of Caere, including that of Banditaccia. It is housed in the Ruspoli Castle in the historic centre of the city overlooking Piazza Santa Maria, and is named after Princess Claudia Ruspoli.

Since December 2014, the Italian Ministry of Culture has managed the museum through the Polo Museale del Lazio (Museum Centre of Lazio), which became the Regional Museum Directorate in December 2019.

== Collections ==
Its collections, structured on two levels, primarily include thematic displays on the remains of the ancient city's numerous necropolises: the Villanovan period for the Sorbo burial ground; the Hellenistic period: the Tasmie tomb and the Banditaccia sarcophagi tomb; various bucchero ceramics, amphorae, funerary vases, and even some figurative sarcophagus lids (original or reproduced). Notable pieces from these archaeological areas are also preserved at the National Etruscan Museum in the Villa Giulia in Rome, and the Louvre in Paris.

Since 2015, the museum has housed two extraordinary finds: the Euphronios Krater and Euphronios Kylix. These are two Attic red-figure pottery pieces from the late 6th century BC, magnificent examples of the finest Athenian ceramic production. Both vases were stolen during illegal excavations in the Cerveteri area and taken abroad, where they were long exhibited: the Krater at the Metropolitan Museum of Art in New York and the Kylix at the Getty Villa in Malibu. Finally returned to the Italian state, after an initial placement in the National Etruscan Museum, the two masterpieces were permanently relocated to the National Archaeological Museum of Cerveteri.

== Gallery ==
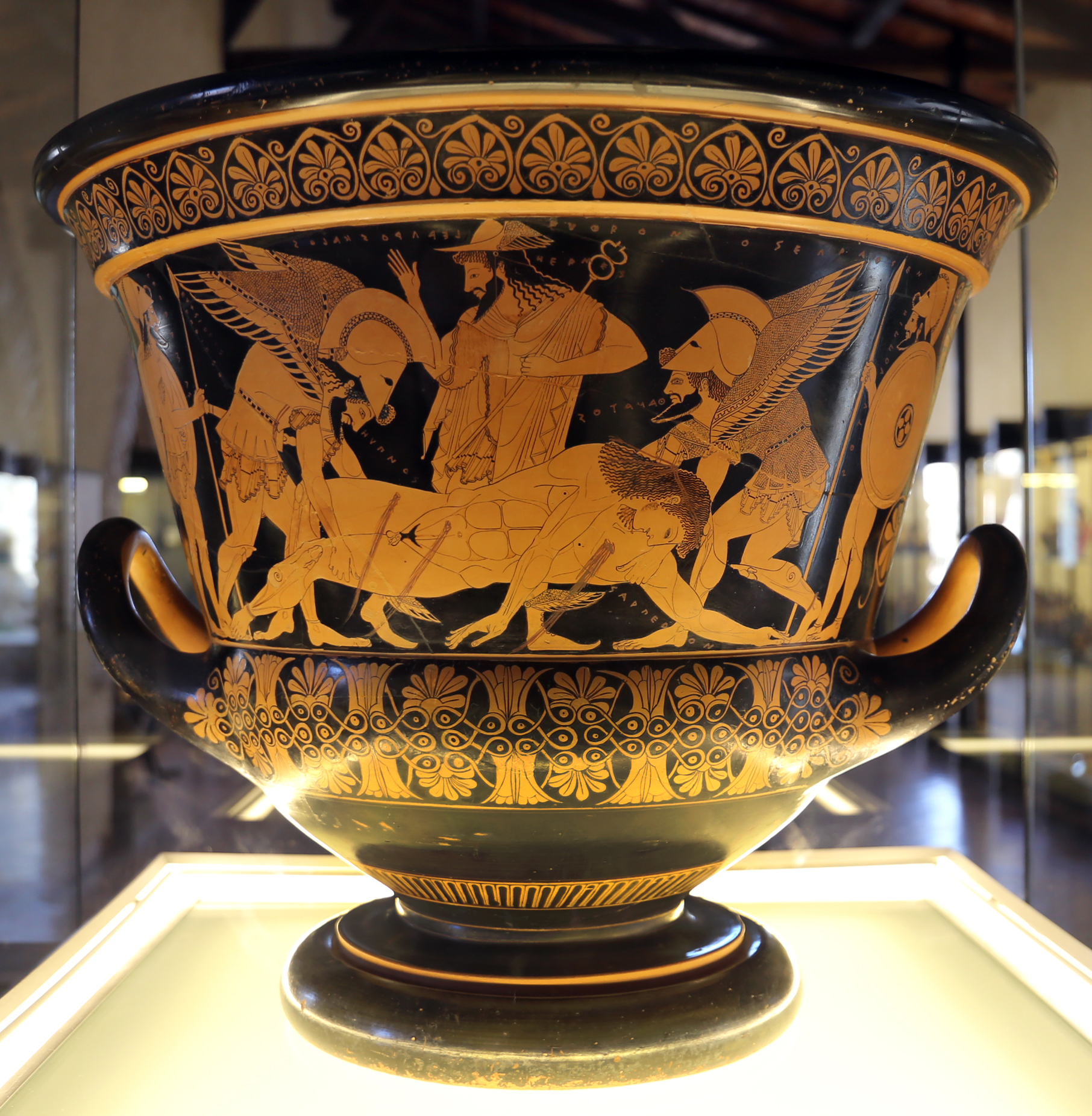
Euphronios Krater

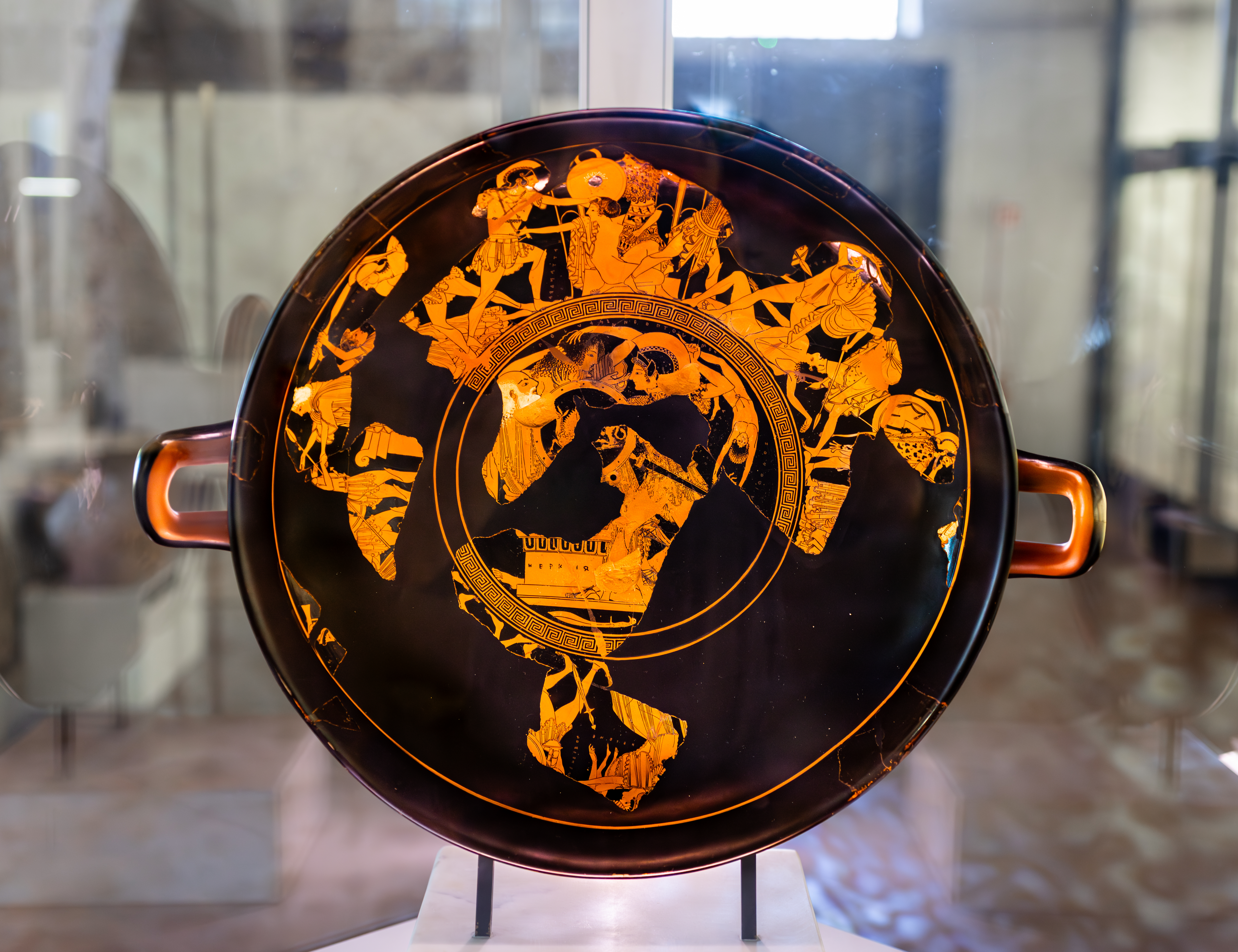
Euphronios kylix

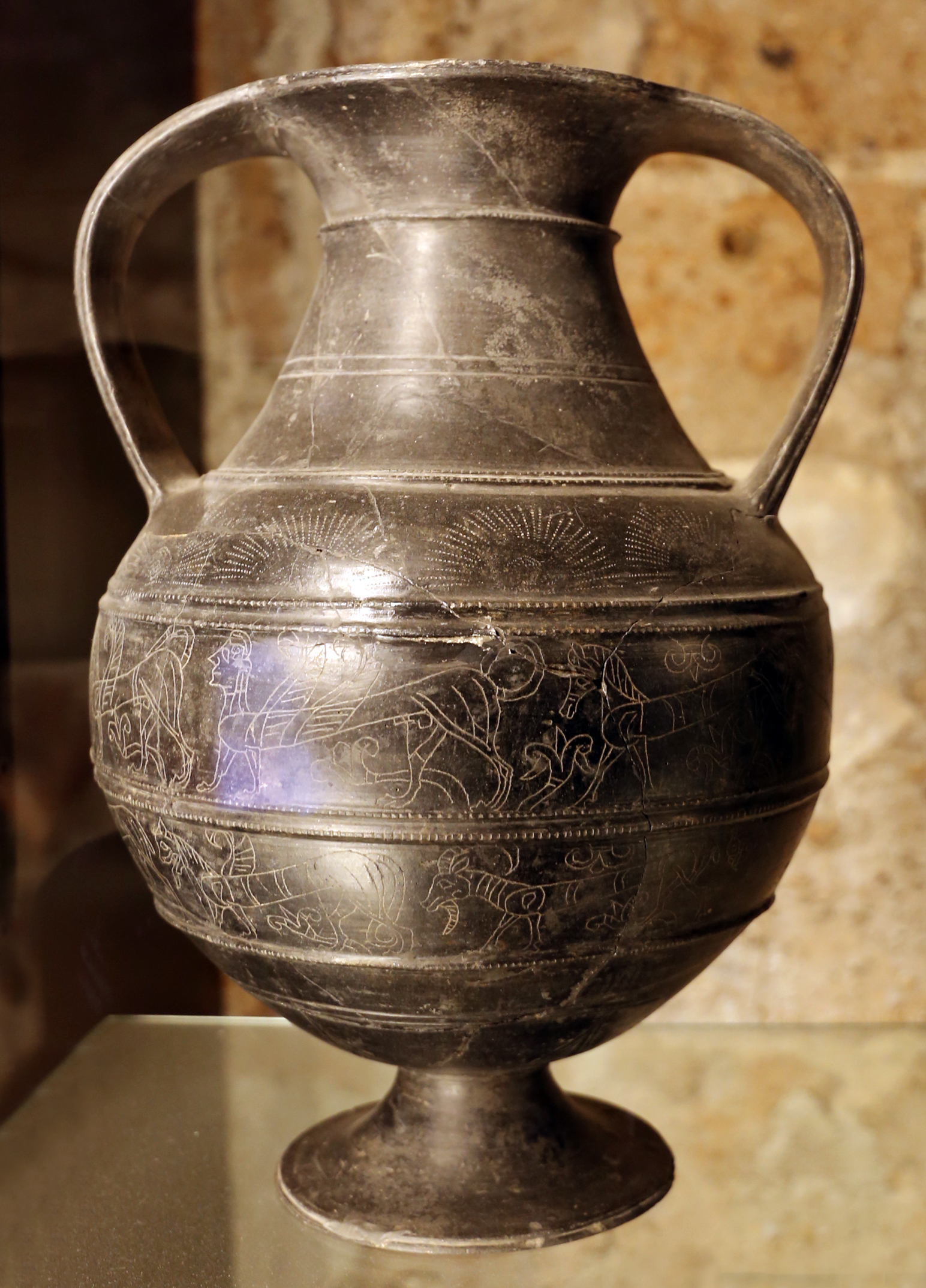
Nikosthenic amphora with incised zoomorphic decoration, Bucchero, c. 610–590 BCE

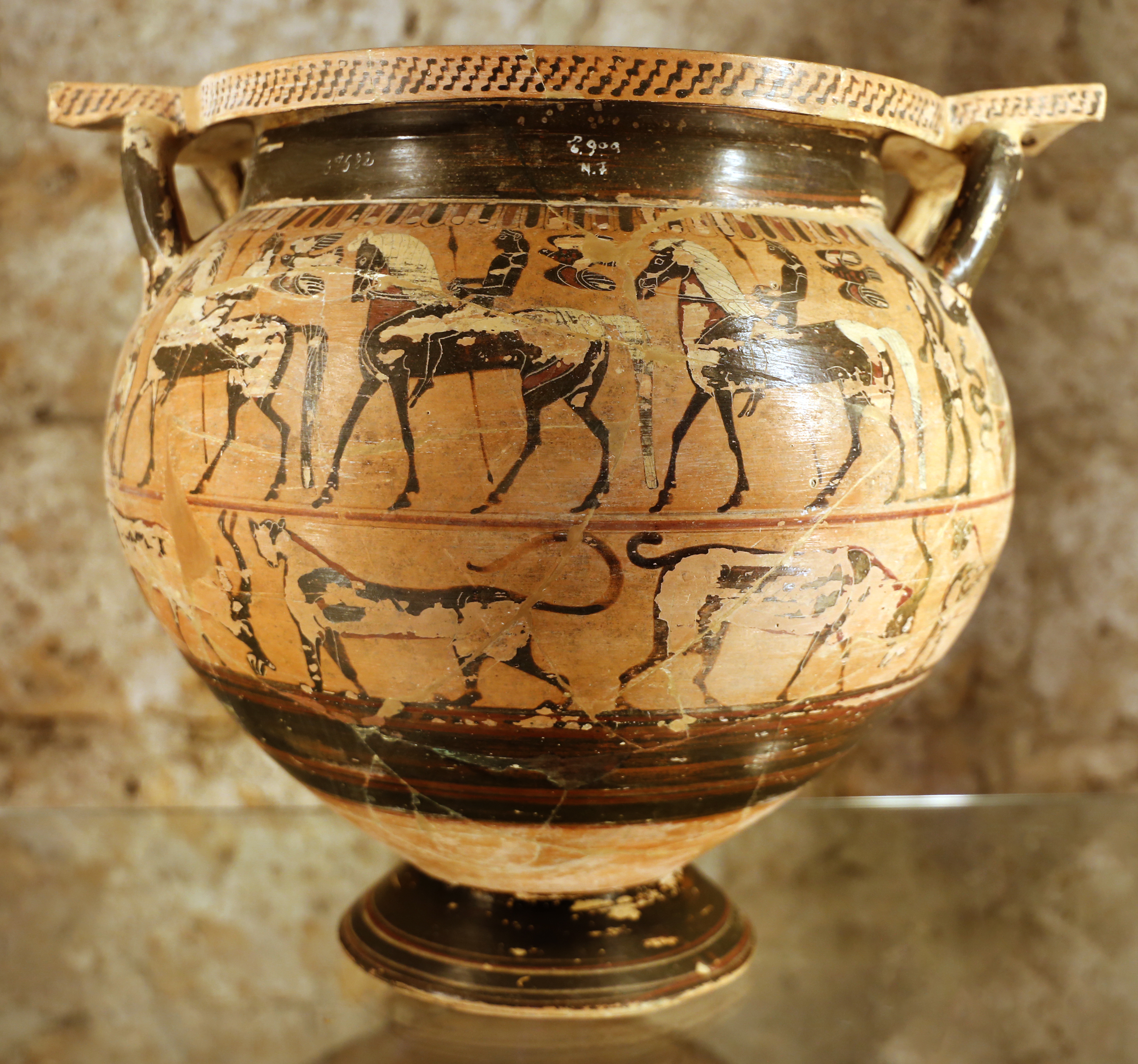
Corinthian krater depicting a departure for war, c. 550 BCE

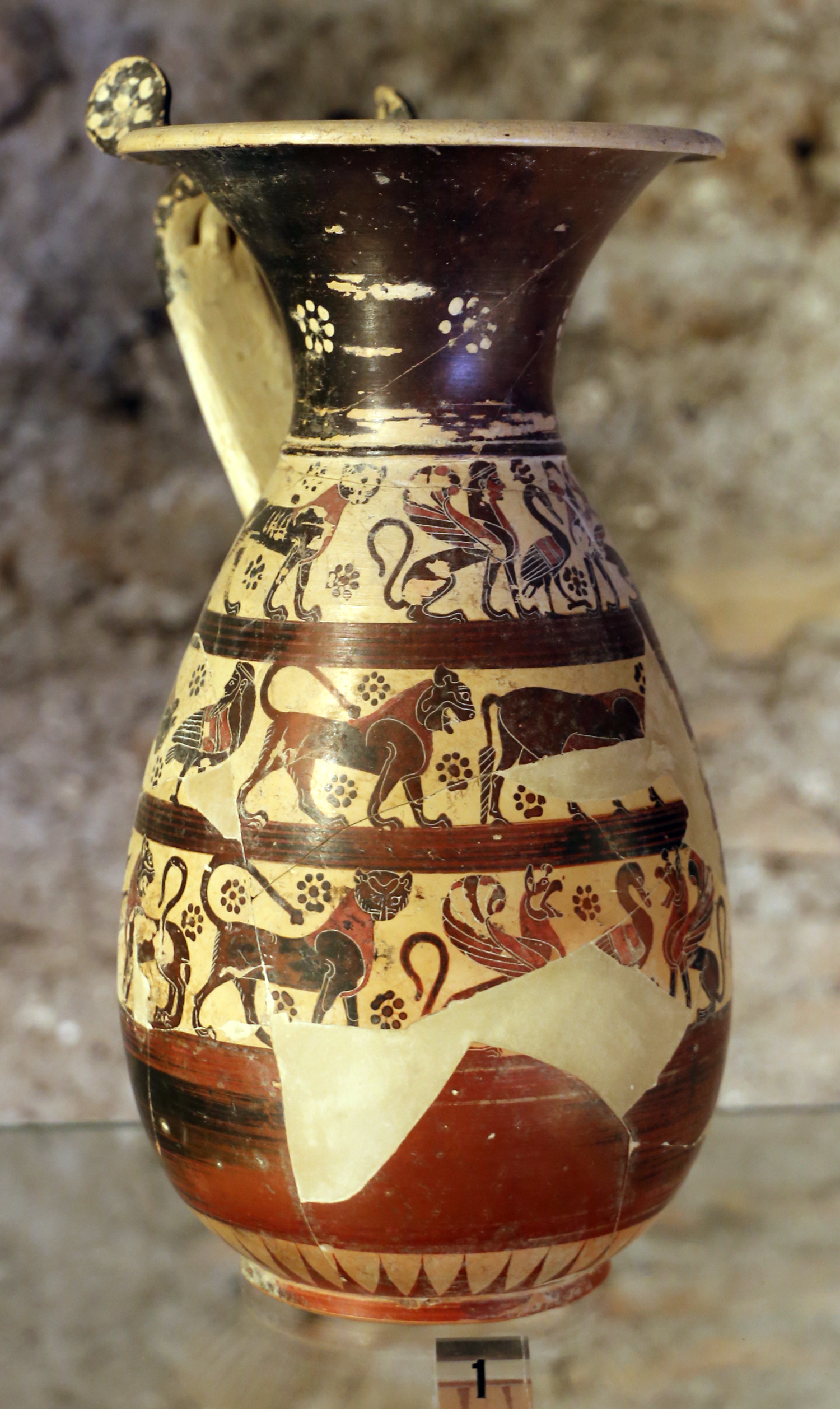
Corinthian oinochoe with animal frieze, c. 650–600 BCE

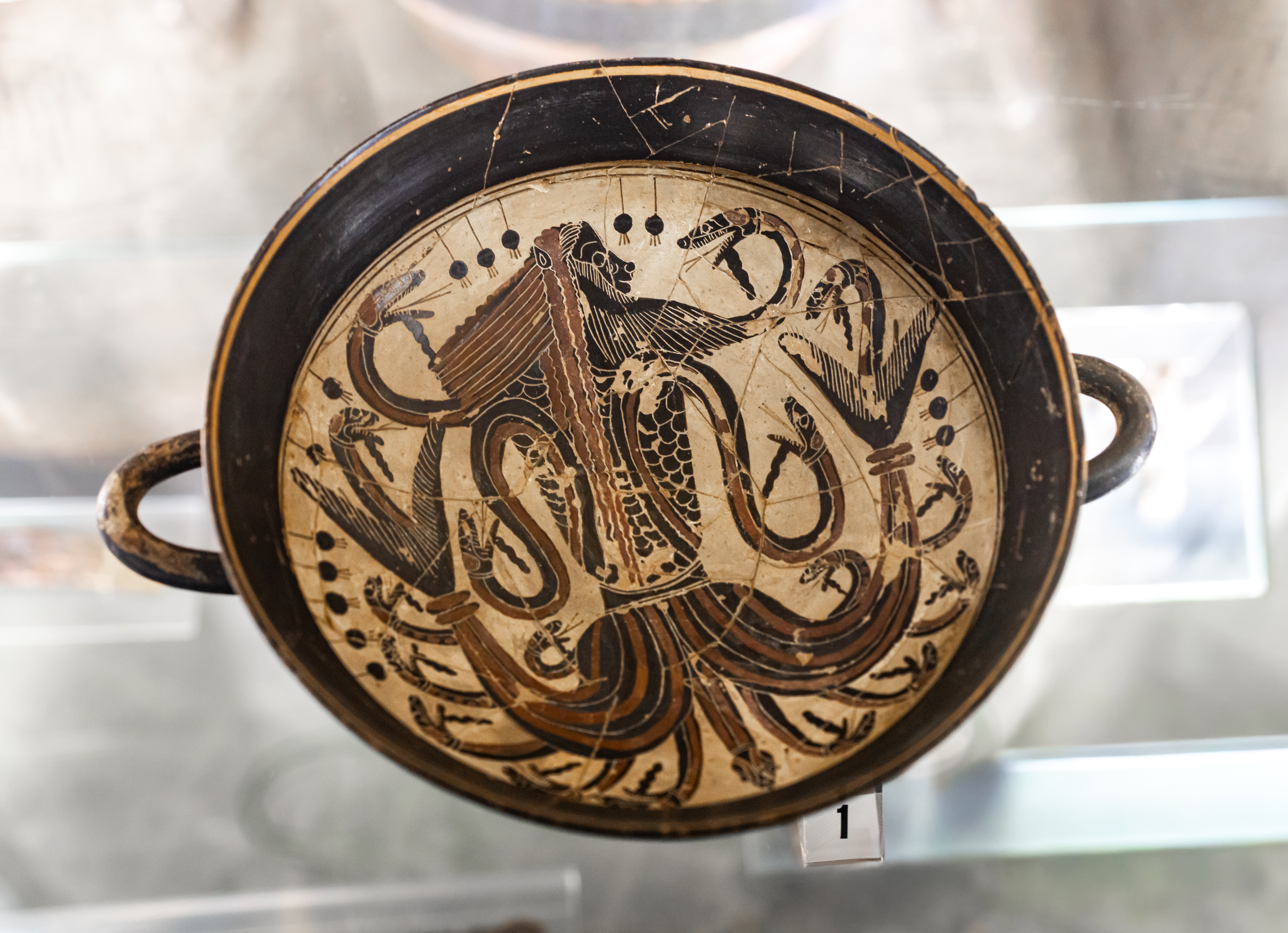
Laconian kylix depicting the Typhon, c. 570–550 BCE

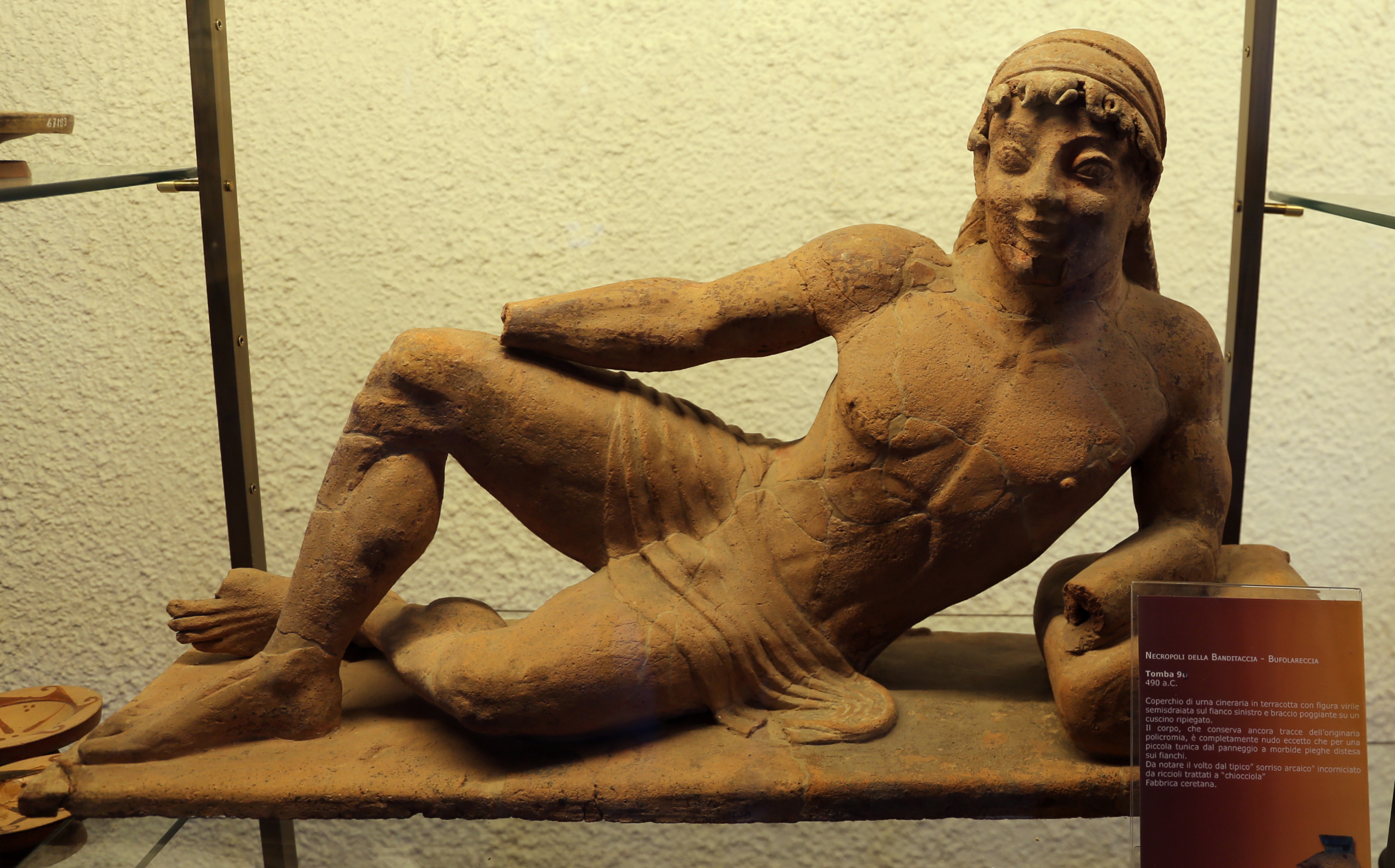
Lid of a cinerary urn depicting a reclining youth, c. 490 BCE

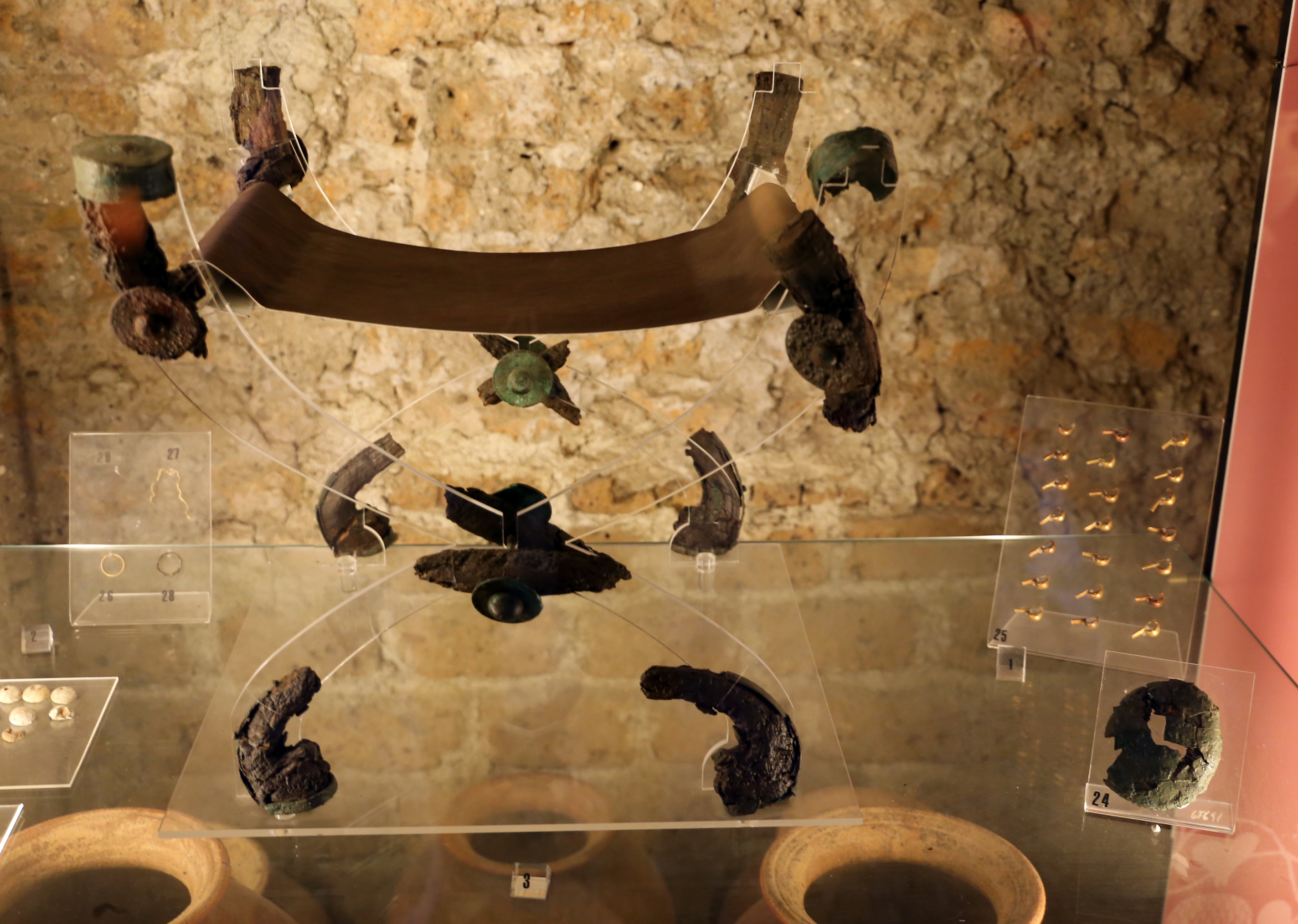
Curule seat, c. 600–550 BCE

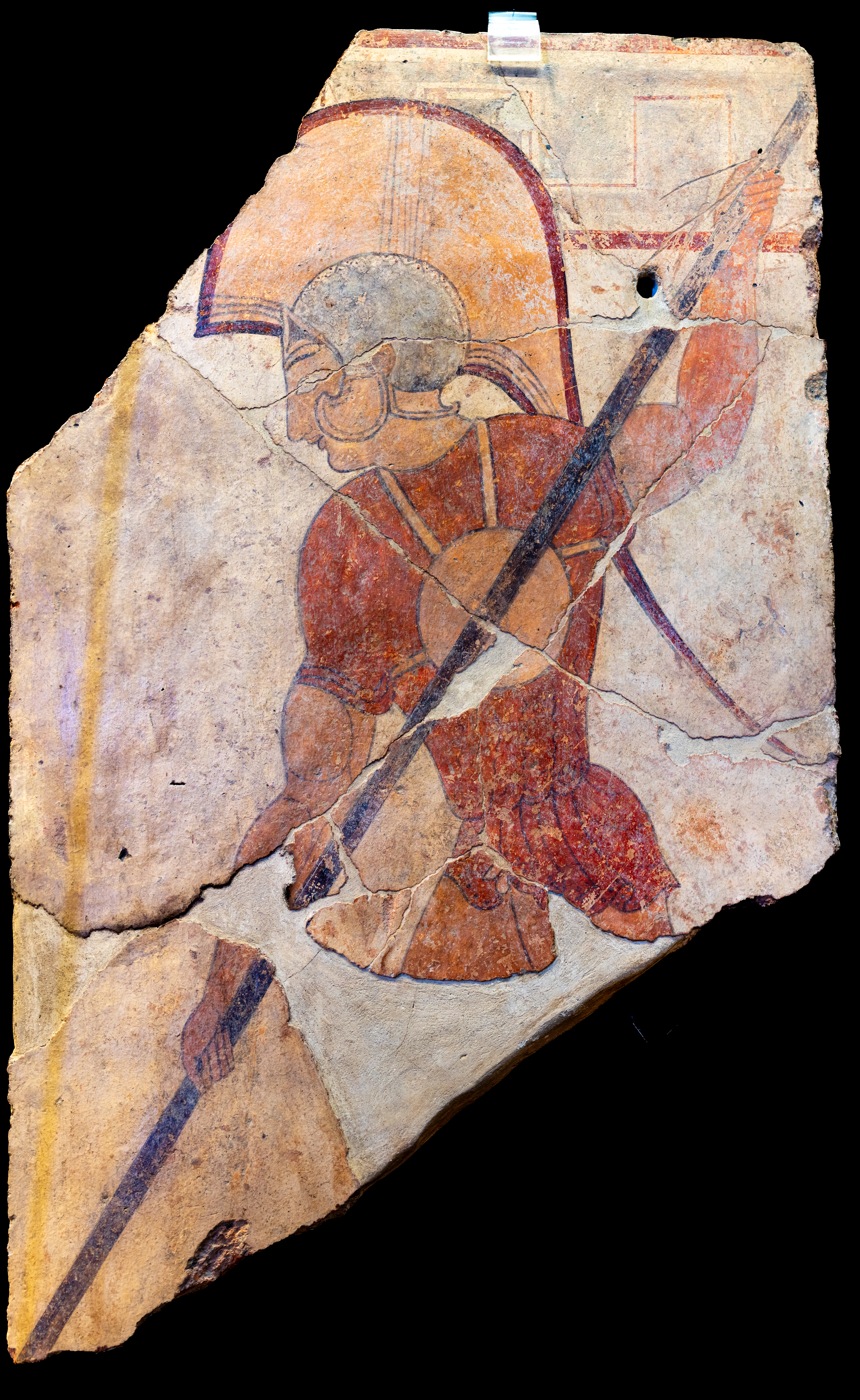
Terracotta plaque depicting a warrior, c. 530–500 BCE

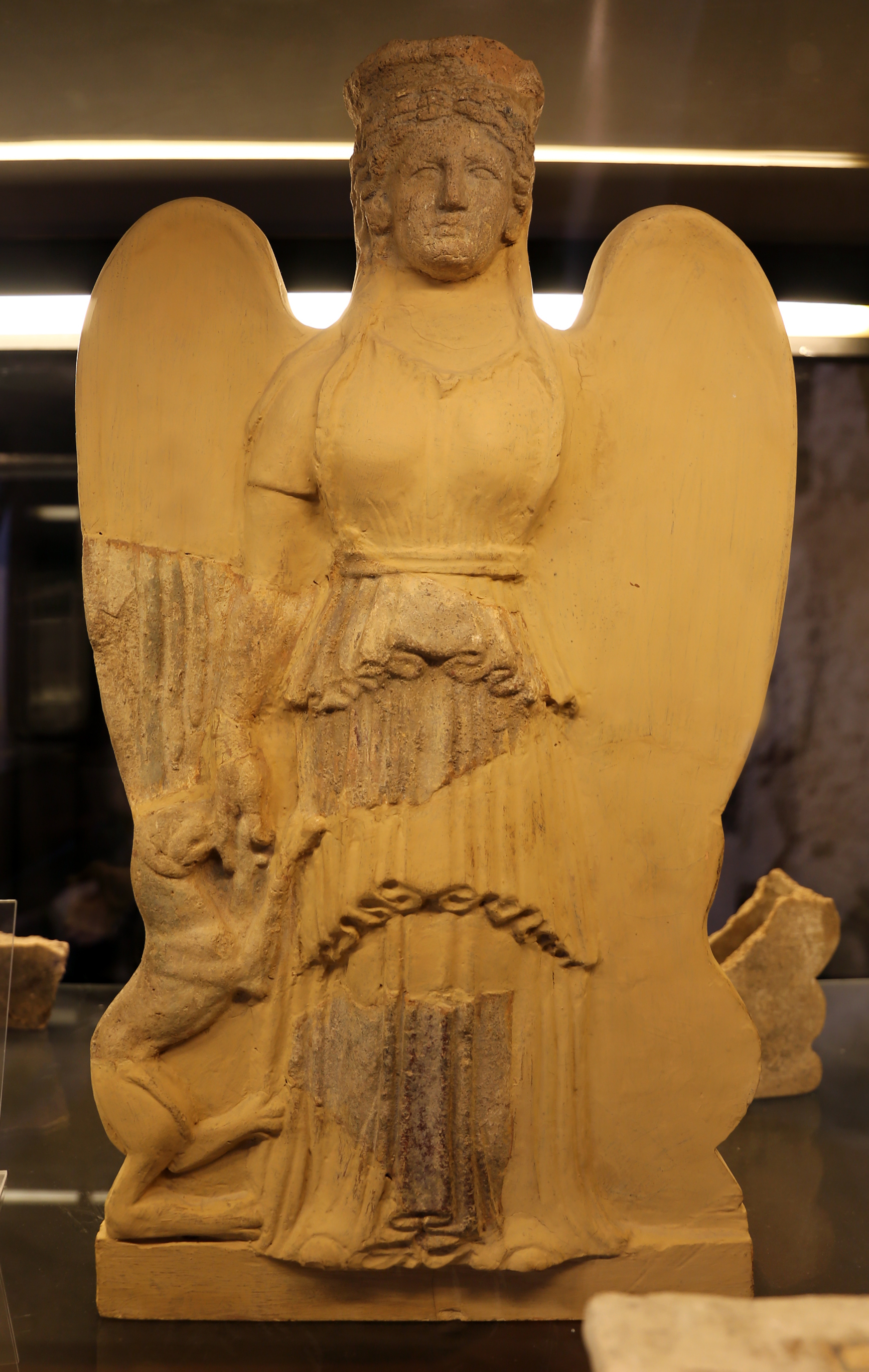
Acroterion from the Sanctuary of Hera, c. 550–500 BCE.

== See also ==
- Euphronios Krater
- Necropolis of the Banditaccia
