= Tita Vendia vase =

The Tita Vendia vase is a ceramic impasto pithos (wine container) made around 620-600 BC, most likely in Rome. The pithos, fragmentary and preserved in sherds, carries one of two earliest known inscriptions in the Latin language (the Vendia inscription) which is interpreted by some as the earliest instance of a bipartite female Latin name with praenomen and gentilicum.

== Discovery ==
The sherds of the vase were found by Raniero Mengarelli and deposited in the collection of Museo di Villa Giulia. The exact location of the find is unknown, but may be Cerveteri (ancient Caere) or somewhere in Faliscan territory.

== Etrurian type of vases ==
The vase belongs to a type found in Southern Etruria. In its original form, based on the collection of sherds found, it was likely to have been approximately 35 cm (14 in) tall and 45 cm (18 in) at its maximum diameter. The letters, 15–25 mm (0.59–0.98 in) tall, had been scratched near the bottom. They were inscribed by a right-handed artisan, using reversed letter S, and with letters VH instead of F (vhecet instead of fecit); according to Baccum, this rules out Faliscan origin of the vase.

== Inscription ==
The inscription reads:

ECOVRNATITAVENDIASMAMAR […] EDVHE

The lacuna between MAMAR and EDVHE is ten to twelve letters wide. Only part of it has been reliably filled by interpreters. The missing part may have contained the name of a second potter. With the lacuna partially filled the inscription is expanded to:

ECŌ VRNĀ TITĀ VENDIĀS MAMAR[COS … M]ĒD VHE[CED]

The most common English interpretation of this text is:

I am the urn of Tita Vendia. Mamarcos … had me made.

In this interpretation, archaic ECO is used where we would later find Latin ego, since Latin had not yet developed a separate symbol for the voiced velar /ɡ/; the personal name vendias uses archaic genitive declension (as in pater familiās) which is omitted in Tita, most likely due to a writing error. Those who read Mamarcos or Mamarce typically identify him as a potter. There are also alternative interpretations:

- that vrna connects to TITA as vrna tvta, i.e. "this whole urn".
- that tita should be interpreted as an adjective, meaning "prosperous".
- that vrna tita is a piggy bank.
- that tita is a teat that feeds Vendia wine.
