= Looted art =

Art that was taken illicitly

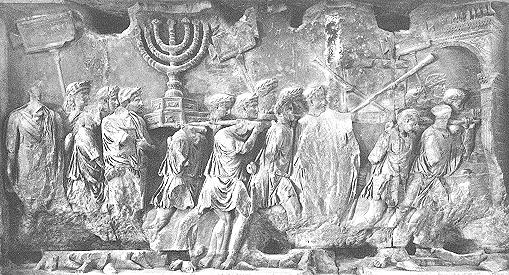
The sack of Jerusalem, from the inside wall of the Arch of Titus, Rome

Looted art has been a consequence of looting during war, natural disaster and riot for centuries. Looting of art, archaeology and other cultural property may be an opportunistic criminal act or may be a more organized case of unlawful or unethical pillage by the victor of a conflict. The term "looted art" reflects bias, and whether particular art has been taken legally or illegally is often the subject of conflicting laws and subjective interpretations of governments and people; use of the term "looted art" in reference to a particular art object implies that the art was taken illicitly.

Related terms include art theft (the stealing of valuable artifacts, mostly because of commercial reasons), illicit antiquities (covertly traded antiquities or artifacts of archaeological interest, found in illegal or unregulated excavations), provenance (the origin or source of a piece of art), and art repatriation (the process of returning artworks and antiques to their rightful owners).

== History ==
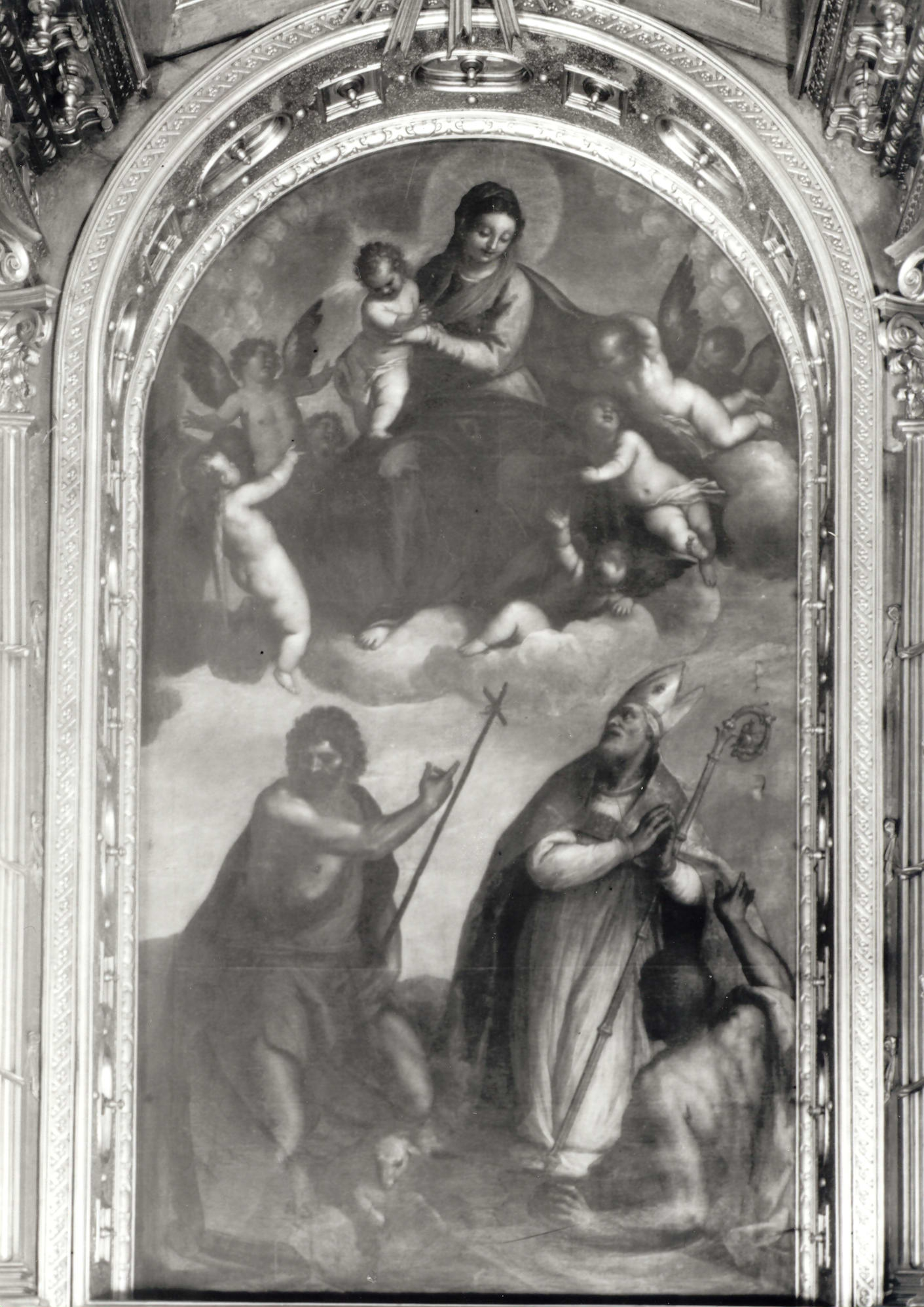
Virgin and Child with St. John the Baptist and St. Stanisław by Palma il Giovane was looted by Napoleon and returned to Warsaw in the 1820s. It was later destroyed by the Germans during the Warsaw Uprising.

Art looting has a long history, the winning party of armed conflicts often plundering the loser, and in the absence of social order, the local population often joining in. The contents of nearly all the tombs of the Pharaohs were already completely looted by grave robbers before the invasion of Egypt by Alexander the Great in 332 BCE. There have been a total of seven sackings of Rome. The Old Testament includes several references to looting and to the looting of art and treasures; in the Book of Chronicles it is said: "King Shishak of Egypt attacked Jerusalem and took away the treasures of the Lord's temple and of the royal palace; he took everything, including the gold shields that Solomon had made", and in the Book of Jeremiah 15:11 the Lord says: "Jerusalem, I will surely send you away for your own good. I will surely bring the enemy upon you in a time of trouble and distress ... I will give away your wealth and your treasures as plunder. I will give it away free of charge for the sins you have committed throughout your land." Other famous examples include the Roman Sack of Corinth in 146 BC, the Sack of Constantinople by the Fourth Crusade, the Sack of Baghdad in 1258, Hernán Cortés and the looting of the Aztec gold. In only some of these was the removal of artworks for their own sake (rather than the value of their materials for example) a primary motivation.

Since the rise of an art market for monumental sculpture, abandoned monuments all over the world have been at risk, notably in Iran, Syria and Iraq, the old territories of Mesoamerican culture and Cambodia.

After the looting of Europe by Napoleon, others copied the institutionalized model of systematic plunder and looting. During the American Civil War, legal frameworks and guidelines emerged that justified and legalized the plunder and looting of opposing parties and nations. Henry Wager Halleck, a United States Army officer, scholar, and lawyer argued: "No belligerent would be justifiable in destroying temples, tombs, statutes [sic], paintings, or other works of art (except so far as their destruction may be the accidental or necessary result of military operations.) But, may he not seize and appropriate to his own use such works of genius and taste as belong to the hostile state, and are of a moveable character?"

In July 1862, Francis Lieber, a professor at Columbia College, who had worked with Halleck on guidelines for guerrilla warfare, was asked by Halleck, now General-in-Chief of armies of the Union, to develop a code of conduct for the armed forces. The code of conduct, published as General Orders No. 100 on 24 April 1863, signed by United States President Abraham Lincoln, later became known as the Lieber Code and specifically authorized the Armies of the United States to plunder and loot the enemy – a mindset that Hitler's armies copied one century later. The Lieber Code said in Article 36: "If such works of art, libraries, collections, or instruments belonging to a hostile nation or government, can be removed without injury, the ruler of the conquering state or nation may order them to be seized and removed for the benefit of the said nation. The ultimate ownership is to be settled by the ensuing treaty of peace." Russian and American forces relied on similar frameworks when they plundered Germany after the defeat of the Nazis.

The Lieber Code further defined the conditions of looting and the relationship between private plunder and booty and institutionalized looting "All captures and booty belong, according to the modern law of war, primarily to the government of the captor." (Article 45), "Neither officers nor soldiers are allowed to make use of their position or power in the hostile country for private gain, not even for commercial transactions otherwise legitimate." (Article 46) and "... [I]f large sums are found upon the persons of prisoners, or in their possession, they shall be taken from them, and the surplus, after providing for their own support, appropriated for the use of the army, under the direction of the commander, unless otherwise ordered by the government." (Article 72)

Massive art looting occurred during World War II; see art theft during World War II.

== Looting of countries ==
=== Looting of Afghanistan ===
Many art pieces and artifacts from Afghanistan were looted during several wars; scores of artworks were smuggled to Britain and sold to wealthy collectors. "There are also fears that the bulk of the collection once in Kabul Museum, ... is now in smugglers' or collectors' hands. The most famous exhibits were the Begram ivories, a series of exquisite Indian panels nearly 2,000 years old, excavated by French archaeologists in the Thirties (1930s)". In November 2004, much of the missing collection numbering 22,513 items was found safely hidden. Over 200 crates had been moved downtown for storage at the end of the Soviet occupation including the Bactrian gold and Bagram Ivories. Some 228 of these treasures, including pieces of Bactrian Gold and many of the Bagram Ivories, were exhibited at the National Gallery of Art in Washington, D.C., from 25 May 25 to 7 September 2008.

=== Looting of Cyprus ===
Following the invasion of Cyprus in 1974 by Turkey and the occupation of the northern part of the island, churches belonging to the Cypriot Orthodox Church have been looted in what is described as "one of the most systematic examples of the looting of art since World War II". Several-high-profile cases have made headline news on the international scene. Most notable was the case of the Kanakaria mosaics, 6th-century AD frescos that were removed from the original church, trafficked to the US and offered for sale to a museum for the sum of US$20,000,000. These were subsequently recovered by the Orthodox Church following a court case in Indianapolis.

The northern part of the island is where the church and art looting was concentrated. It is rumored that the Turkish-Cypriot leaders did not feel an obligation to preserve the artifacts and monuments in the north because they felt that the Greek-Cypriot government had oppressed them for too long.

Archaeological sites, museums, churches, monasteries, castles, libraries, and private art collections have all been affected by the looting of the northern area of Cyprus; icons, frescoes, archaeological artifacts, and cultural heritage have been stripped from areas around the island and have been taken to places all over the world or simply destroyed. Some believe that this has been done to 'Turkify' the northern region of the country and erase the characteristics of the Cypriot predecessors, while people like Aydin Dikmen have been working to make money off of cultural heritage artifacts by selling them in international markets. It was one of the most systematic examples of the looting of art since World War II.

==== Non-Christian places of importance ====
Many non-Christian sites have been affected by the looting and destruction of northern Cyprus. During the time of the invasion, work on archaeological sites was halted. While the projects on the Greek-Cypriot southern area were started again after a short period of delay, the projects in the Turkish north were never started again. Many of the houses and workshops associated with archaeological projects in the north were looted, so the work that had been done was lost to the researchers. Many areas on the island of Cyprus were damaged by bombing and machine gun fire, and because of these issues, the pavement mosaics of the House of Dionysos in Paphos suffered extensive damage. The fighting not only was destroying Byzantine and Christian cultural heritage, but it was even destroying culture that had been in existence for far longer. There have been appeals filed with UNESCO, ICOM, and ICOMOS to help with the preservation of the remaining cultural heritage on the island, and a representative of UNESCO was appointed to help by 1976.

==== Looted religious sites and icons ====
On the island of Cyprus before the invasion, the majority of the inhabitants were Greek-Cypriots, and for these citizens, the Greek Orthodox Church was and continues today to be central to their identity and faith. In the north, there is a fear that Christianity is dying out because the churches and monasteries have been destroyed, transformed, or are falling into ruin. The northern Turkish inhabitants have transformed some former religious sites into mosques, army barracks, stables, night clubs and hotels, and it has been documented that only 3 churches and 1 monastery are currently in a dignified state out of the 520 churches and monasteries that were in the northern area of the country before the Turkish invasion. At least 55 churches have been converted into mosques, while another 50 churches and monasteries have been converted into other structures to serve the Turkish-Cypriots'. A spokesman for the Turkish Republic of Northern Cyprus stated that the transformations of buildings happened because the buildings were falling into ruin, and he also stated that it is an Ottoman custom to transform buildings attributed to other religions into mosques; this idea can be linked to other Islamic sites, like the Dome of the Rock in Jerusalem.

Yannis Eliades, the director of the Byzantine Museum of Nicosia, has estimated that 25,000 icons have disappeared since the Turkish military initially invaded the island in 1974, while others estimate that between 15,000 and 20,000 icons are missing, along with dozens of frescoes and mosaics dating between the 6th and 15th centuries, thousands of chalices, wood carvings, crucifixes, and Bibles. However, there have been some case in which the Church of Cyprus was able to reclaim icons or mosaics, and this is a great step forward for the reformation of their cultural heritage.

The transformations of religious sites have also spurred lawsuits from the few hundred Greek-Cypriots that are still living in the northern area. The Greek Orthodox Church has taken Turkey to the European Court of Human Rights because they were preventing practicing Christians from worshiping at previously religious, but currently transformed buildings. Even though the buildings have been destroyed or converted, the Greek-Cypriot citizens still want to be able to worship at these places to keep continuity with their faith without regard to the destruction.

==== Aydin Dikmen considered a key suspect ====
Aydin Dikmen is a 60-year-old man who has been arrested in relation to the looting and selling of looted goods from the island of Cyprus. He had been suspected of being involved in the selling of looted art since 1982, but he kept a low profile and fell off the radar for some time. His involvement was cemented when Peg Goldberg was sued by the Church of Cyprus in 1989 because she knew that she bought the mosaics from Dikmen; he claimed that he found the remains in the rubble of a church that had been forgotten and basically destroyed while he was working as an archaeologist in the northern part of Cyprus. We also have documentation of another transaction where Dikmen worked with art collectors in the United States; Dominique de Menil, of the Menil Collection in Houston, Texas, bought two 13th-century frescoes from Dikmen on behalf of the Church of Cyprus in 1983.

Those two previous cases are only two cases in which Dikmen's presence has been suggested; he has been implicated in many more transactions, but those accusations have yet to be proven. However, in 1997, former colleagues of Dikmen helped the authorities arrest Dikmen and raid his many apartments. In these apartments, some of which Dikmen rented under false names and used as storage space, the authorities found a surplus of icons, frescoes, early Bibles, ancient pottery, statues, and coins from Cyprus. After learning of another residence of Dikmen's, the authorities found 30 to 40 more crates filled with icons, frescoes, mosaics, and artifacts. Also in one of the residences, the authorities found drawings containing information on how to cut out mosaics to keep the faces of the religious figures intact, while still taking the piece away from the original space; this shows how systematic and planned out the looting of the churches and monasteries was for Dikmen and his associates in the northern part of Cyprus. The organization and the intense planning involved brings up the issue of possible aid coming from Turkish authorities in the northern part of Cyprus; there are rumors that the government and military knew about the looting and chose to not do anything about it. This discomforting idea is continually straining the ties between Greece, Turkey, and Cyprus.

Since Dikmen's arrest in 1998, the Antiphonitis frescoes and the Kanakarian mosaics have been returned to Cyprus, and soon the 13th-century frescoes currently housed by the Menil Collection in Houston will be returned to the island, as well. The search for the looted art of Cyprus continues, and there seems to be more and more evidence of Dikmen's presence in other transactions of international looted art. Many think that Dikmen is just a middle man who is working on behalf of more knowledgeable and rich patrons, but the mystery is still not solved.

=== Looting of Germany ===
After World War II, Germany was looted by Allied and Soviet forces; the systematic pillaging and looting by the Allies (particularly the Soviet Union) is still causing disputes and conflicts between Germany, Russia and the United States, as many of the objects have never been returned to Germany.

The Soviet plunder of Europe's art treasures constituted institutionalized revenge, while the American military's role in the stealing of Europe's treasures mostly involved individuals looting for personal gain.

The looting of Germany by the Soviet Union was not limited to official Trophy Brigades, but included many ordinary soldiers and officials who plundered for personal reasons. At least 2.5 million artworks and 10 million books and manuscripts disappeared in the Soviet Union and later in Russia, including but not limited to Gutenberg Bibles and Impressionist paintings once in German private collections. According to Time magazine, the Soviets created special "hit lists ... of what the Soviet Union wanted" and followed the historical "examples" given by Napoleon, Hitler, British and American armies. Other estimates focus on German artworks and cultural treasures supposedly secured against bombing in safe places that were looted after World War II, detailing 200,000 works of art, three kilometers of archival material and three million books.

Germany's collections lost 180,000 artworks, which, according to cultural experts are "being held in secret depots in Russia and Poland". The stolen artworks include sculptures by Nicola Pisano, reliefs by Donatello, Gothic Madonnas, paintings by Botticelli and Van Dyck and Baroque works rendered in stone and wood. In 2007, Germany published a catalog of missing artworks to document the extent, prevent the resale, and speed up the return of the war booty. Berlin's State Museum alone lost around 400 artworks during World War II. The German state (Land) of Saxony-Anhalt still maintains a list entitled Beutekunst ("Looted Art") of more than 1000 missing paintings and books believed confiscated by the US or the Soviet Union.

Poland is also in possession of some collections that Germany evacuated to remote places in Eastern Germany (the so-called "Recovered Territories" that are part of Poland since 1945) as well as in occupied Poland. Among those there is a large collection from Berlin, which in Polish referred to as Berlinka. Another notable collection in Polish possession is Hermann Göring's collection of 25 historic airplanes (Deutsche Luftfahrt Sammlung) – ironically, it contains two Polish planes captured by Germans during their invasion of Poland (including a PZL P-11c of Army Kraków). Poland refuses to return those collections to Germany unless Germany returns some of the collections looted in Poland and still in its possession in exchange.

Entire libraries and archives with files from all over Europe were looted and their files taken to Russia by the Soviet Trophy Brigades. The Russian State Military Archive (Rossiiskii Gosudarstvennyi Voennyi Arkhiv- RGVA) still contains a large number of files of foreign origin, including papers relating to Jewish organisations.

Berlin's Gemäldegalerie the Kulturforum lost 441 major paintings, among them seven works by Peter Paul Rubens, three Caravaggios and three Van Dycks. The looted artworks might still be in "secret depositories ... in Moscow and St Petersburg". Veteran BBC foreign correspondent Charles Wheeler, then Berlin correspondent of the BBC's German Service, received a small painting as a wedding present in 1952 from an East German farmer, given in return for some potatoes. The portrait of Eleonora of Toledo (1522–1562), the daughter of the Neapolitan viceroy and wife of the first Duke of Florence, Cosimo di Medici I, which he found from the Commission for Looted Art in Europe, had been looted from the Gemäldegalerie. The gallery had photographed the picture by Alessandro Allori (1535–1607) before closing down and, in 1939, putting its collection in secure storage areas, which Soviet troops broke into at the war's end. Wheeler covered the process in It's My Story: Looted Art for BBC Radio 4, contacting the Commission for Looted Art, the identification of the painting's rightful owner in Germany and the hand-over in Berlin. On 31 May 2006 the commission, the Prussian Cultural Heritage Foundation, representing the Berlin state museums, announced the return of the painting.

The Eberswalde Gold Treasures and German Merovingian Art Treasures were taken from Berlin to Soviet Russia.

British troops and the Naval War Trophies Committee also looted artworks from Germany, including several pictures by marine artist Claus Bergen ("Wreath in the North Sea in Memory of the Battle of Jutland", "The Commander U-boat", "Admiral Hipper's Battle Cruiser at Jutland" and "The German Pocket Battleship Admiral Von Scheer Bombarding the Spanish Coast"), Carl Saltzmann ("German Fleet Manoeuvres on the High Seas") and Ehrhard ("Before the Hurricane at Apia Samoa" and "During the Hurricane at Apia"). The pictures were looted from Naval Academy at Flensburg-Mürwik, as documented by a 1965–66 Ministry of defense file in the UK National Archives. The trophies were sent to British museums, five remain in the National Maritime Museum in London (NMM), and one picture ("Before the Hurricane at Apia") was lent to HMS Calliope in 1959, lost, and formally written off in 1979. The National Maritime Museum admitted in January 2007 that "the documentation at the NMM and the National Archives is not complete"; according to spoliation guidelines, the pictures should be regarded as having been "wrongly taken".

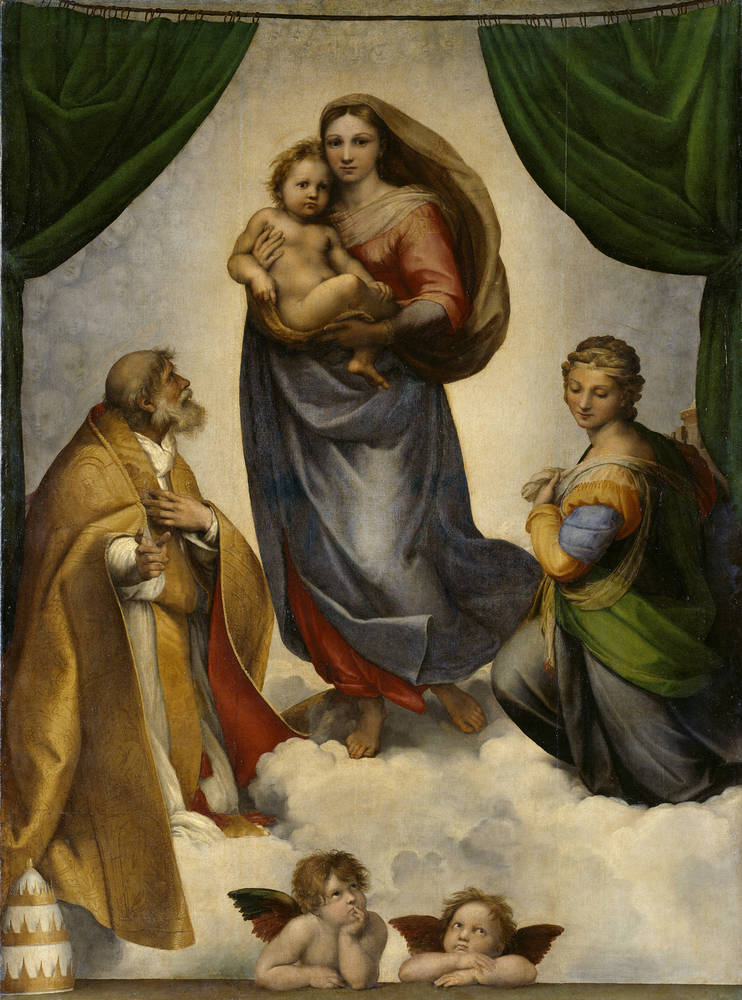
The Sistine Madonna by Raphael, looted by the Soviets after World War II and returned to the Dresden Gallery (Gemäldegalerie Alte Meister) in East Germany in 1955.

On 25 August 1955, the Soviet functionaries handed over to the representatives of East Germany 1240 paintings from the Dresden Gallery, including the Sistine Madonna and Sleeping Venus, which had been saved and restored by the Soviets after the Battle of Berlin. According to Irina Antonova, famous long standing Director of the Pushkin Museum, more than 1,500,000 items of cultural value (including the frieze reliefs of the Pergamon Altar and the Grünes Gewölbe treasures) were restituted to German museums at the behest of the Soviet government in the 1950s and 1960s. "We have not received anything in return," Antonova observed in 1999.

The reasons for the Soviet looting of Germany and the subsequent Russian attempts are revealed in an interview that Irina Antonova gave to the German Die Welt newspaper; the interview specifically focuses on the Russian notion of looting, using the historical example of Napoleon as a direct reference for the Russian justification of the Plunder of Germany: "Three quarters of all the Italian art in the Louvre came to Paris with Napoleon. We all know this, yet the works remain in the Louvre. I know the place where Veronese's large painting used to hang in the monastery of Vicenza. Now it's in the Louvre where it will stay. It's the same with the Elgin Marbles in London. That's just the way it is."

At the 1998 conference, Eizenstat was "impressed ... almost overwhelmed" when Boris Yeltsin's government promised "to identify and return art that was looted by the Nazis and then plundered by Stalin's troops as 'reparations' for Germany's wartime assault." Alarmed by these negotiations, the State Duma of the Russian Federation promulgated a law (15 April 1998) whereby "the cultural valuables translocated to the USSR after World War II" were declared national patrimony of the Russian Federation and each occasion of their alienation was to be sanctioned by the Russian parliament. The preamble to the law classifies the remaining valuables, such as Priam's Treasure, as a compensation for "the unprecedented nature of Germany's war crimes" and irreparable damage inflicted by the German invaders on Russian cultural heritage during the war.

Following the law adopted by the State Duma on 17 April 2002, the Hermitage Museum returned to Frankfurt an der Oder the looted medieval stained-glass windows of the Marienkirche; six of the 117 individual pieces, however, still remain missing. Andrei Vorobiev, the former Academic Secretary of the Museum, confirmed in 2005 the assumption that they are still in Russia (in the Pushkin Museum.) According to the Hermitage, "As a gesture in return, the German company Wintershall paid for the restoration of a church destroyed during the Second World War, Novgorod's Church of the Assumption on Volotovoe Pole". In addition, the Hermitage did demand and receive a compensation of USD 400,000 for "restoring and exhibiting the windows".

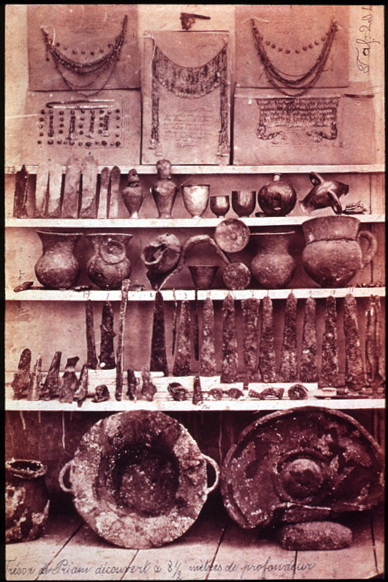
The so-called Priam's Treasure, discovered at and illegally taken from Troy by the German archaeologist Heinrich Schliemann. It disappeared in 1945 from a protective bunker in Berlin to which it had been transferred from the Berlin State Museums and reappeared in September 1993 at the Pushkin Museum in Moscow.

A silver collection consisting of 18 pieces was plundered by the NKVD after World War II from the German Prince of Anhalt, who suffered under both the Nazis and Bolsheviks alike, before he was posthumously rehabilitated. In a so-called "good will gesture", the collection was returned to the descendants of the Prince by the Ministry of Culture even though the Russian prosecutor originally refused the request of the children of the rehabilitated prince.

Lev Bezymenski, a Russian officer and translator who became a controversial historian and professor at Moscow's military academy, died on 26 June 2007 at age 86 in Moscow. He was a military intelligence officer of the 1st Belorussian Front under Marshal Georgy Zhukov, participated in the interrogation of German Generalfeldmarschall Friedrich Paulus, and translated the message confirming Adolf Hitler's death for Stalin. After the Red Army captured Berlin in 1945, he investigated Adolf Hitler's death and headquarters. In his many articles and books (Bezymenski, L. Stalin and Hitler (2002), Bezymenski, L. (1968). The Death of Adolf Hitler: Unknown Documents from Soviet Archives. Harcourt Brace. ISBN 978-0-7181-0634-8), he failed to mention that he looted several containers filled with around 100 gramophone records from the Reich Chancellery, recordings performed by the best orchestras of Europe and Germany with the best soloists of the age. The collection stolen by Bezymenski, who himself was Jewish, included many Russian and Jewish artists. Bezymenski brought the looted collection of the Führer's favourite discs to Moscow, where he felt "guilty about his larceny and hid the records in an attic, where his daughter, Alexandra Besymenskaja, discovered them by accident in 1991." Bezymenski understood the political implications of his actions and "kept quiet about the records during his lifetime for fear that he would be accused of looting." The collection still remains in Russia.

==== Baldin Collection ====
In another high-profile case, Viktor Baldin, a Soviet army captain in World War II and later directed the Shchusev State Scientific Research Museum of Architecture in Moscow, took 362 drawings and two small paintings on 29 May 1945 from Karnzow Castle in Brandenburg which had been stored there by the Kunsthalle Bremen. Russian Culture Minister Mikhail Shvydkoi estimates the worth of the Baldin Collection at USD 1.5 billion. From the entire collection of the Kunsthalle, more than 1,500 artworks are still missing; in 1991 and 1997, the Kunsthalle published printed catalogues of the works of art from the lost during the evacuation in the Second World War.

=== Looting of Indonesia ===
During the colonization of Indonesia by the Dutch which span for three and a half centuries, many cultural objects were taken either due to purchase, looting, spoils of war, or excavation. The looting of Indonesian art continued after the country gained independence from the Netherlands, as missionary projects and individual excavations remained common till the 1970s. An investigation made in the late 1970s revealed most of the objects obtained by the missionaries were not ethically sourced. Many of these objects were taken back to the Netherlands, and are now stored in the National Bank of Amsterdam, distributed across museums in the Netherlands or were offered for sale in the market for art and antiquities.

In 2020, the Dutch government returned around 1,500 objects to Indonesia from the Nusantara Museum in Delft. This reparation project began in 2016 whereby the museum initially offered 12,000 objects for repatriation to Indonesia, which the culture director-general subsequently reduced. Additionally, the Lombok Treasure that consists of more than 200 cultural objects from Lombok has also been returned to Indonesia since the 1970s. Due to an agreement made by the Indonesia and the Netherlands in 1975, at least half of the Lombok Treasure is still held and displayed in many Dutch museums. Although in July 2022, it was announced that the Lombok treasure would be returned to Indonesia. The Netherlands currently have 8 Hindu-Buddha heads that are speculated to be taken from Borobudur. There are calls for their return, but the institutions have yet to give an affirmative response, and there are debates regarding who it should be returned to, or whether they should be returned at all.

=== Looting of Iraq ===
More recently, the term is used to describe the looting in Iraq after the American-led invasion, including, but not limited to, the National Museum of Iraq. Following the looting during the chaos of war, the British and American troops were accused of not preventing the pillaging of Iraq's heritage. Furthermore, many U.S. military and civilian personnel were subsequently caught in U.S. airports trying to bring in stolen artifacts. The occupying forces, busy with combat missions, failed to protect the National Museum and Library in Baghdad from Iraqi thieves. While the Iraqi Ministry of Oil building was quickly and famously secured in the hours following the invasion for its reported wealth of geological maps, U.S. troops were busy with combat missions as museums, national archives and government offices were vandalized by the Iraqis themselves. The troops were criticized: "American officials came under sharp criticism from archaeologists and others for not securing the museum, a vast storehouse of artifacts from some of civilization's first cities."

After the U.S. troops entered Baghdad on 9 April 2003, at least 13,000 artifacts were stolen during the looting by Iraqis, including many moved from other sites into the National Museum for safekeeping. U.S. troops and tanks were stationed in that area but, concerned with defending themselves from attack and without orders to stop the looting, "watched for several days before moving against the thieves." Sergeant Jackson of the 1st Marine Battalion explained that "...our orders were to avoid engaging religious Muslims who were unarmed. So when groups of Imams demanded to remove religious items to prevent them from being defiled by the infidels, how were we supposed to know that they were thieves? Our captain didn't want to create an international incident by arresting religious leaders."

The Boston Globe writes: "Armies not of fighters but of looters, capitalizing on a security vacuum after war, have pillaged Babylon." Donny George, the curator of Iraq's National Museum says about the art looting:

"It's the crime of the century because it affects the heritage of all mankind."

George's comments followed widespread reporting that 100 percent of the museum's 170,000 inventoried lots (about 501,000 pieces) had been removed by Iraqi looters. In fact, about 95 percent of the museum's contents never left the museum. According to investigators of the thefts, about two percent of the museum pieces were stored elsewhere for safekeeping. Another two percent were stolen, in an apparent "inside job", just before U.S. troops arrived; about one percent, or about 5,000 items, were taken by outside looters. Most of the looted items were tiny beads and amulets.

The horror of art looting in general is made clear by Hashem Hama Abdoulah, director of the museum of antiquities in Sulaymaniyah, in the Kurdish-controlled zone of northern Iraq.

"When your history is stolen from you, you lose your sense of that history. Not just the Iraqi people, but all of civilization that can trace its roots back to this area."

Many other looted art objects ended up in black markets with rich art collectors and art dealers, mostly in the United States, Great Britain, Italy and Syria; in 2006, the Netherlands returned to Iraqi authorities three clay tablets that it believed had been stolen from the museum. One of the most valuable artifacts looted during the plunder of the National Museum of Iraq, a headless stone statue of the Sumerian king Entemena of Lagash, was recovered in the United States with the help of Hicham Aboutaam, an art dealer in New York. Thousands of smaller pieces have remained in Iraq or been returned by other countries, including Italy and the Netherlands.

Some of the artifacts have been recovered, custom officials in the United States intercepted at least 1,000 pieces, but many are still advertised on eBay or are available through known collectors and black markets. "U.S. troops, journalists and contractors returning from Iraq are among those who have been caught with forbidden souvenirs." The U.S. Department of State, Bureau of Educational and Cultural Affairs maintains a list and image gallery of looted artworks from Iraq at the Iraq Cultural Property Image Collection.

Despite public announcements and temporary efforts by the Iraqi and American administrations, the situation in Iraqi Museums and archaeological sites did not improve. Donny George, the curator of Iraq's National Museum, the first person who raised his voice and alarmed the world about the looting in Iraq after the American invasion and publicly stated his opinion about the "ongoing failure of Iraqi leaders and the American military to protect the sites", left the country and resigned in August 2006. Before he left, he closed and sealed the museum and plugged the doors with concrete. In an article in Newsweek, he even said that the stolen items should not be returned to Iraq under the given circumstances: "We believe this is not the right time now to have them back. Since we know all about them and are promised them back whenever we want them, it is better to keep them in these countries."

In August 2021, some 17.000 artworks from ancient Mesopotamia were returned to Iraq from museums in the U.S. They had been looted after the US-led invasion of Iraq and, despite their illegal provenance, had been sold on the international art market. One of these items, the so-called the Gilgamesh Dream Tablet, a historical stone slab with inscriptions, had been bought in 2014 through international auction house Christie's for more than $1.6 million by a museum in Washington, D.C.

=== Looting of Italy ===
The looting of Italian art was not limited to Napoleon alone; Italian criminals have long been, and remain, extremely active in the field, and Italy's battle to recover the antiquities it says were looted from the country and sold to museums and art collectors worldwide is still ongoing. The Italian government and the Art Squad of the Carabinieri, Italy's military police force, made special efforts to "[crack] the network of looters, smugglers, and dealers supplying American museums," collecting "mountains of evidence—thousands of antiquities, photographs, and documents—seized from looters and dealers in a series of dramatic raids." According to the BBC, Italian authorities have for several years insisted on the return of stolen or looted artworks from wealthy museums and collectors, particularly in America. Italy has successfully fought numerous lawsuits that have resulted in the repatriation of many items of looted art and antiquities from many famous American institutions, including the Metropolitan Museum of Art in New York, the J. Paul Getty Museum in Los Angeles, the Cleveland Museum of Art, the Minneapolis Institute of Arts, the Princeton Museum of Art, the Toledo Museum of Art, and the private collection of Leon Levy and his wife, Shelby White.

As the result of lawsuits filed by the Italian and Turkish governments, as well as the work of investigative journalist Peter Watson and archaeologist Vernon Silver, both the Metropolitan Museum and the J. Paul Getty Museum have been repeatedly exposed as two of the world's biggest institutional recipients of looted and stolen Mediterranean artefacts, and the museums benefited from the illegal antiquities trade, both through direct acquisition, and via donations and bequests from major private collectors. A significant number of Met and Getty acquisitions over a period of at least 40 years were everntually shown to have been sourced from a major international illegal antiquities trading network that centred on Italian art dealer Giacomo Medici. From the late 1960s, Medici rose to become the central figure in a large criminal conspiracy, acting as the middleman between gangs of tombaroli (tomb robbers) - who systematically looted tens of thousands of important artefacts from Italian and other Mediterranean archaeological sites, as well as stealing objects from museums, churches and private collections - and an elite group of American and British dealers who helped Medici to "launder" his contraband and sell it to major buyers like the Met, the Getty and leading American private collectors.

Medici typically paid the tombaroli small sums for the looted and stolen goods, and then smuggled them out of Italy to Switzerland, where they were restored. Taking advantage of the lax attitudes and practices of 'cooperative' auction houses - notably Sotheby's in London - Medici built up an elaborate network of front companies and elite antiquities dealers and galleries, including the British dealer Robin Symes, Rome-based American dealer Robert E. Hecht, and Hollywood dealer and producer Bruce McNall. A major investigation by the TPC (the art crimes division of the Carabinieri) beginning in the 1990s, which eventually resulted in Medici's conviction, recovered tens of thousands of looted artefacts, and extensive documentary evidence, including thousands of sequential photographs that showed the journey of these looted objects from excavation, through restoration, to their final placement in museum collections, as well as a crucial handwritten 'organigram' (organisational chart) that named and linked all the members of Medici's operation. TPC investigations also revealed that Medici used front companies to anonymously sell and then buy back many items, often multiple times, in order to manipulate the market, as well as allowing him to acquire the all-important Sotheby's provenances. In February 2016, TPC officials announced that a raid on Robin Symes' warehouse in the Geneva Freeport had uncovered a huge collection of 17,000 looted antiquities, nearly all of which are thought to have been sourced from Medici, and which Symes secretly placed there ca. 2000 in order to conceal their existence from the executors of the estate of his former lover and business partner, Christo Michelaides, who died in 1999.

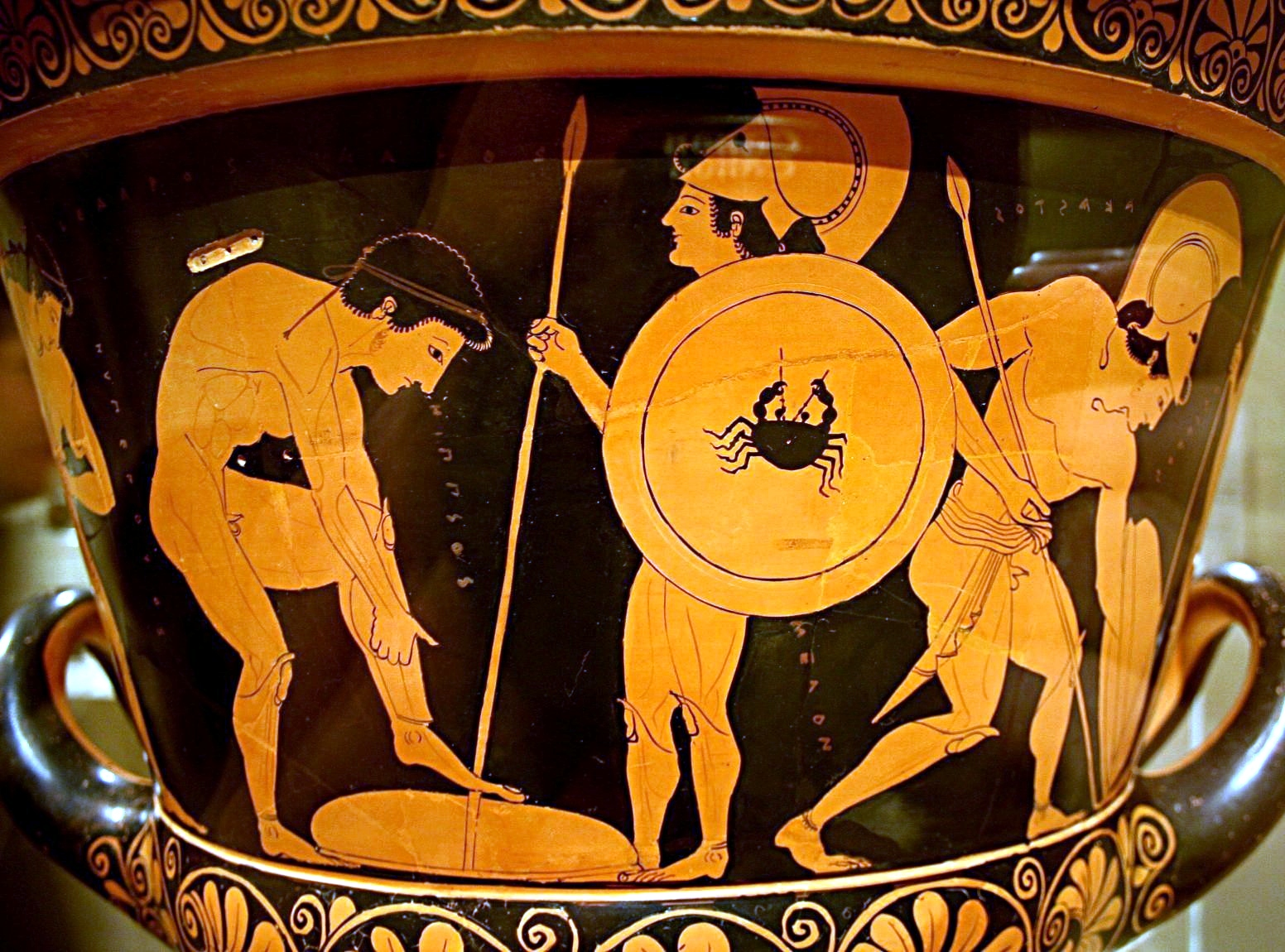
Euphronios Krater, a 2,500-year-old Greek vase, stolen from an Etruscan tomb and smuggled from Italy, returned to Italy by the Metropolitan Museum of Art in 2006

In 2006, the Metropolitan Museum of Art finally agreed to relinquish ownership of a 2,500-year-old Greek vase known as the Euphronios Krater, a krater painted by Euphronios, after the TPC was able to establish that the object had been looted from an Etruscan tomb and smuggled out of Italy by the Medici gang. The Met also surrendered 15 pieces of Sicilian silver and four ancient vessels in exchange for long-term loans of other antiquities. According to the New York Times, the case, "of its kind, perhaps second only to the dispute between Greece and Great Britain over the Elgin marbles," "became emblematic of the ethical questions surrounding the acquisition of ancient art by major museums."

The Metropolitan Museum has been involved in several other major controversies involving antiquities believed or proven to have been looted or stolen, including:

- the Cloisters Cross, a large Romanesque cross carved from walrus ivory, said to have been carved in England, but possibly made in Germany. It was initially offered to the British Museum in 1961 by its then owner, a shady Yugoslav 'collector' called Ante Topić Mimara, who is now widely believed to have acquired as part of a huge collection of art and antiquities that he stole at the end of WWII from the Central Collecting Point in Munich, the Allied clearinghouse for the repatriation of material looted by the Nazis. The British Museum eventually declined to buy the cross because Topić Mimara would not provide proof that he had full title to the object, but immediately after the British Museum's option expired in 1963, the cross was purchased for the Met by curator Thomas Hoving for GBP£200,000. The Cross is currently still in the collection of the Met, at its Cloisters Museum annexe.
- the Morgantina treasure, a 16-piece hoard of 3rd century BCE Roman silver, valued at US$100 million. Acquired in the early 1980s, it was later shown to have been looted from an important archaeological site in Morgantina, Sicily. After another protracted lawsuit, the Met was also forced to relinquish the treasure, and it was repatriated to Sicily in 2010.

In an interview with Archaeology, a publication of the Archaeological Institute of America, investigative journalist Peter Watson wrote in June 2006 that according to the Italian public prosecutor Paolo Ferri, 100,000 tombs have been looted in Italy alone, representing a value of US$500 million. He estimates that the overall monetary value of looted art, including Greece, Turkey, Iraq, Jordan, Syria, Egypt, Cyprus, West Africa, Central America, Peru, and China, is at least four times the Italian figure. Peter Watson and Cecilia Todeschini authored The Medici Conspiracy, a book that uncovers the connection between looted art, the art and antiquities markets, auction houses, and museums.

In 2007, the Los Angeles J. Paul Getty Museum, at the center of allegations by Italian officials about the pillaging of cultural artifacts from the country and other controversies, was forced to return 40 artifacts, including a 5th-century BC statue of the goddess Aphrodite, which was looted from Morgantina, an ancient Greek settlement in Sicily. The Getty acquired the statue in 1988 for US$18 million from an anonymous collector fully aware about the controversy focusing on the unclear provenance and origin. The Getty resisted the requests of the Italian government for nearly two decades, only to admit later that "there might be 'problems' attached to the acquisition." In 2006, Italian senior cultural official Giuseppe Proietti said: "The negotiations haven't made a single step forward"; only after he suggested the Italian government "to take cultural sanctions against the Getty, suspending all cultural cooperation," did the Getty Museum return the antiquities. According to the New York Times, the Getty confirmed in May 2007 that the statue "most likely comes from Italy".

The Museum of Fine Arts in Boston was forced to return 34 stolen artifacts – including Hellenistic silverware, Etruscan vases and Roman statues. The aforementioned institutions have agreed to hand over the artworks in exchange for loans of other treasures.

In 2005 Marion True, former curator of the Getty Museum, and art dealer Robert E. Hecht were placed on trial in Rome; Italy accused them of buying and trafficking stolen and illicit artworks (including the Aphrodite statue). Evidence against both emerged in a 1995 raid of a Geneva, Switzerland, warehouse that contained many stolen artifacts. In September 2007, Italy dropped the civil charges against True. The court hearings against True ended in October 2010, and against Hecht in January 2012, as under Italian law the statute of limitations, for their alleged crimes had expired.

The warehouses were registered to a Swiss company called Editions Services, which police traced to an Italian art dealer, Giacomo Medici. The Carabinieri stated that the warehouses contained 10,000 artifacts worth 50 billion lire (about $35 million). In 1997, Giacomo Medici was arrested; his operation is believed to be "one of the largest and most sophisticated antiquities networks in the world, responsible for illegally digging up and spiriting away thousands of top-drawer pieces and passing them on to the most elite end of the international art market." Medici was sentenced in 2004 by a Rome court to ten years in prison and a fine of 10 million euros, "the largest penalty ever meted out for antiquities crime in Italy."

In another, unrelated case in 1999, the Getty had to hand over three antiquities to Italy after determining they were stolen. The objects included a Greek red-figure kylix from the 5th century BC signed by the painter, Onesimos, and the potter, Euphronios, looted from the Etruscan site of Cerveteri; a torso of the god Mithra from the 2nd century AD; and the head of a youth by the Greek sculptor Polykleitos. According to the New York Times, the Getty refused for several years to return the antiquities to their rightful owners.

Yet another case emerged in 2007, when Italy's art-theft investigation squad discovered a hidden cache of ancient marble carvings depicting early gladiators, the lower portion of a marble statue of a man in a toga and a piece of a column. Italian Culture Minister Francesco Rutelli used the case to underline the importance of these artifacts for Italy. In 2021, the US began returning $10m worth of antiquities stolen from Italy, comprising 200 artefacts including a statue unwittingly bought by Kim Kardashian.

=== Looting of South East Asia ===
During their occupation of Indochina, the French government removed various statues and other objects from the region. During its existence, the Khmer Empire was regularly raided by its neighbours, which resulted in its cultural heritage being distributed widely across the region. The major historian of the Khmer Empire, Lawrence Palmer Briggs, regularly mentions these raids—for example, the sack of Angkor in 1430–31 by the Siamese, who carried off their loot to Ayutthaya, after which "people fled from the 'great and glorious capital' of Khmer civilisation, as if it were ridden with plague". Consequently, the cultural heritage of the region was already widely spread by the time the French founded their protectorate in Indochina in 1864. Briggs describes Preah Khan Kompong Svay as "shamefully looted" in the late 19th century by Louis Delaporte, "who carried the spoils away to French museums (thus beginning the systematic looting of Cambodian temples for the benefit of public and private collections of Europe and America)". He also describes how French tourists well into the 20th century carried off many statues. Therefore, by the early 20th century, it was rare to find Khmer objects in situ and local and foreign collectors, particularly in France, had built up collections of Khmer objects. Many objects from the region were exported to Europe and elsewhere and ended up in museums such as the Guimet in Paris.

During the second world war, whilst France was occupied by Nazi Germany, the Indochina region was controlled variously by the Japanese, locally, and after the war, the French regained control. There followed a period of 35 years of disruption and warfare, including Dien Ben Phu and the Vietnam war. Thereafter Cambodia fell under the control of the notorious Khmer Rouge regime. Some objects left the country during that period, either to save them from destruction or for looting purposes. Reports have suggested that where objects have been moved, local officials and armed forces (both before and after the periods of turmoil) were responsible.

In 1992, a report in The Christian Science Monitor described art experts' concerns about a "rampant degradation of archeological sites and an accelerating trade in stolen artifacts sweeping Southeast Asia" as a consequence of war in Cambodia and instability in the region. Statues were being stripped from Angkor Wat and other sites by smuggling rings often working in collusion with military and political officials, including a major network in Chiang Mai run by a former government minister.

The British-born Thai-based collector Douglas Latchford says that when he and other collectors traversed Cambodia and Thailand in the 1960s, buying and trading Cambodian antiquities, they were not concerned about provenance, but regarded themselves as rescuers of artefacts that otherwise might have been neglected or destroyed. Many of the objects they purchased were later donated or sold to museums. In the 2000s, evidence that the artefacts had been looted persuaded a number of major museums around the world to return the objects to Cambodia.

Among the objects sold or donated to major museums by Latchford are a number of rare ancient Khmer statues, reportedly looted from the temple site of Koh Ker in Cambodia, and at least two Indian seated Kushan Buddhas, looted from the ancient Indian city of Mathura. One of the seated Buddhas was originally offered—via Manhattan dealer Nancy Wiener—to Canada's Royal Ontario Museum, but they ultimately declined to buy it, owing to its dubious provenance. In 2000, it was bought by the National Gallery of Australia, but subsequent investigations exposed the seated Buddha as a looted artwork, and it has since been repatriated to India. Other U.S. museums reported to have received looted Asian artefacts from Latchford include the Denver Museum of Art, the Kimbell Museum in Ft. Worth, Texas, and the Norton Simon Museum.

In 2013, the Met announced that it would repatriate to Cambodia two ancient Khmer statues, known as "The Kneeling Attendants", which it had acquired from Latchford (in fragments) in 1987 and 1992 and gifted to the Met "in honor of Martin Lerner", the Met curator of South and Southeast Asian art. A spokesperson for the Met stated that the museum had received "dispositive" evidence that the objects had been looted from Koh Ker and illegally exported to the United States.

In 2015, the Cleveland Museum of Art voluntarily returned to Cambodia a 10th-century sculpture of the Hindu monkey god Hanuman, after a curator from the museum uncovered evidence that it had been looted—the statue's head having appeared on the market in Bangkok in 1968 during the Vietnam War and its body having appeared on the market in 1972 during the Cambodian Civil War. The museum's director said, "Our research revealed a very real likelihood that it was removed from a site enormously important to the kingdom of Cambodia during a terrible time and its return was completely consistent with the highest legal and fiduciary standards." Tess Davis, an archaeologist and lawyer for the Antiquities Coalition, praised the museum's decision, but said, "The Hanuman first surfaced on the market, while Cambodia was in the midst of a war and facing genocide. How could anyone not know this was stolen property? The only answer is that no one wanted to know."

=== Looting of Poland ===
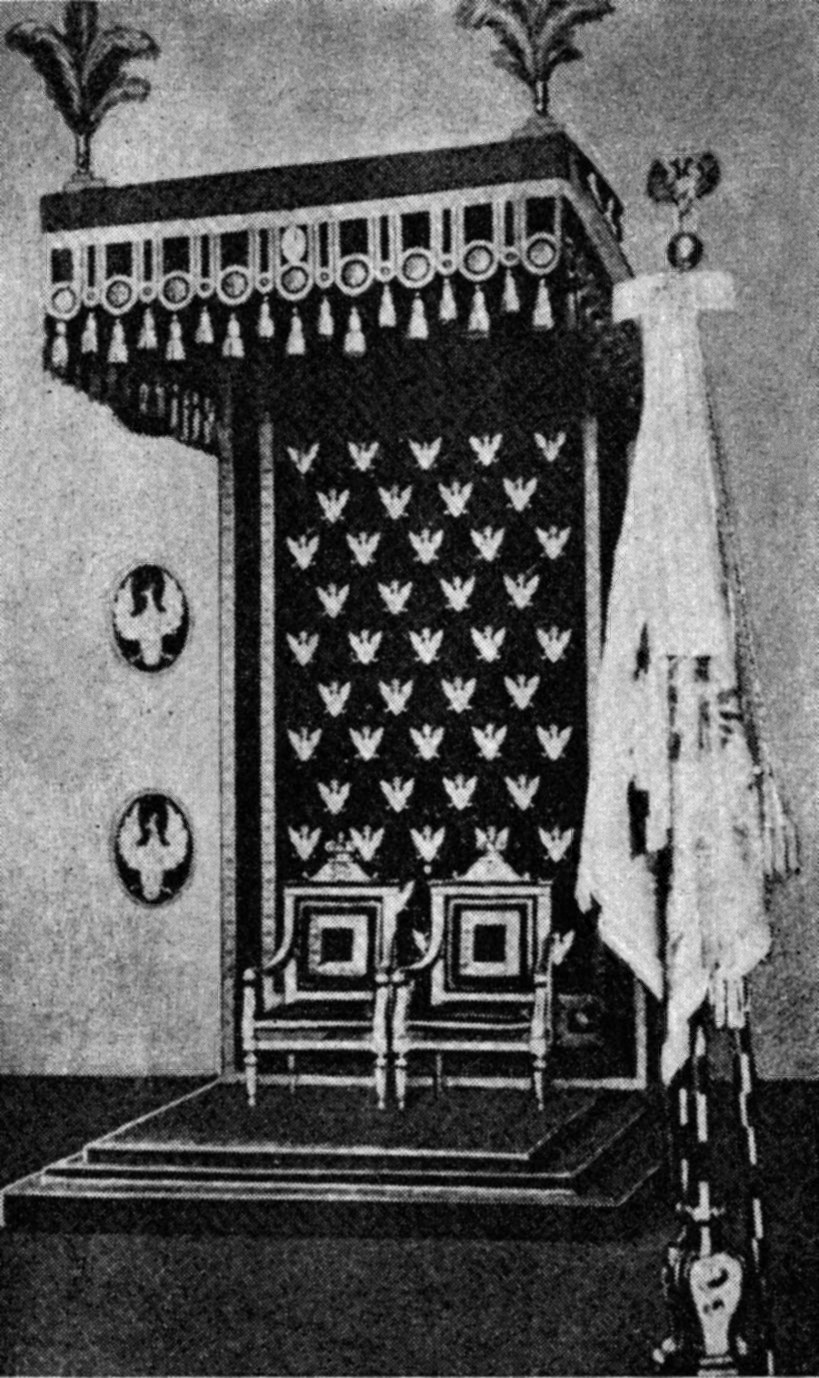
Throne of Stanisław August Poniatowski displayed in the Moscow Kremlin. The throne was looted after the collapse of the November Uprising in the 1830s. In the 1920s, the Soviet government returned it to Poland, yet it was deliberately destroyed by the Germans during World War II.

The Załuski Library, the first public library in Poland, was founded by two brothers, Józef Andrzej Załuski, crown referendary and bishop of Kiev, and Andrzej Stanisław Załuski, crown chancellor and bishop of Cracow. The library was considered one of the most important libraries of the world, featuring a collection of about 400,000 printed items, manuscripts, artworks, scientific instruments, and plant and animal specimens. Located in Warsaw's Daniłowiczowski Palace, it was looted in the aftermath of the second Partition of Poland and Kościuszko Uprising in 1794 by Russian troops on orders from Russian Tsarina Catherine II; the stolen artworks were transported to St. Petersburg and became part of the Russian Imperial Library, which was founded one year later. Although some pieces were returned by the Soviet Union in 1921 and were burned during the Warsaw Uprising against German forces, other parts of the collection have still not been returned by Russia. Polish scientists have been allowed to access and study the objects.

The Polish Crown Jewels were removed by the Prussians in 1795 after the Third Partition of the Polish–Lithuanian Commonwealth.

After the collapse of the November Uprising, literary and art treasures were removed from Poland. Poland regained some of the artefacts after the Treaty of Riga — the furnishings of the Warsaw Castle and the Wawel Castle.

During the Second World War, Germany tried to destroy Poland completely and exterminate its population as well as culture. Countless art objects were looted, as Germany systematically carried out a plan of looting prepared even before the start of hostilities (see also Nazi plunder). Twenty-five museums and many other facilities were destroyed. The total cost of German theft and destruction of Polish art is estimated at 20 billion dollars, or an estimated 43% of Polish cultural heritage; over 516,000 individual art pieces were looted (including 2,800 paintings by European painters; 11,000 paintings by Polish painters; 1,400 sculptures, 75,000 manuscripts, 25,000 maps, 90,000 books including over 20,000 printed before 1800, and hundreds of thousands of other items of artistic and historical value). Soviet troops afterward contributed to the plunder as well.

=== Looting of Latin and South America ===
The looting of Central and South America by the conquistadors is one of the best-known plunders in the world.

Roger Atwood writes in Stealing History: Tomb Raiders, Smugglers, and the Looting of the Ancient World: "Mayan stonework became one of those things that good art museums in America just had to have, and looters in the jungles of southern Mexico and Guatemala worked overtime to meet the demand." (See: Maya stelae#Looting)

Looting in Mesoamerica has a long tradition and history. Graves are often looted before the archaeologists can reach them, and the artifacts are then sold to wealthy collectors in the United States, Japan, or Europe. Guillermo Cock, a Lima-based archaeologist, says about a recent find of dozens of exquisitely preserved Inca mummies on the outskirts of Peru's capital city, Lima: "The true problem is the looters," he said. "If we leave the cemetery it is going to be destroyed in a few weeks."

=== Looting of Spain ===
==== Peninsular War ====
During Napoleon's invasion of Spain, Joseph I planned to host the best art of Spain in a museum, so he ordered to collect all possible art works.

In 1810, 1000 paintings were looted in Seville by the French Army. Most paintings came from religious buildings. Over 180 paintings were stolen by Marshal Soult, including some of Murillo.

El Escorial in Madrid also suffered from looting, were many precious artworks were amassed by the occupant army.

When Joseph I was leaving Spain, he abandoned more than 200 paintings from the Spanish royal collection. Some of these paintings were gifted to the Duke of Wellington by Ferdinand VII.

The best known looted piece is The Immaculate Conception of Los Venerables. It was looted by Marshal Jean-de-Dieu Soult in 1813 and taken to France. Later, in 1852, it was bought by the Louvre. Vichy Regime made an exchange of artwork with Spanish Government and returned to Spain.

=== Looting of Africa ===
The looting of African art primarily came about as a result of the Scramble for Africa, which saw many European powers colonize the African continent. A notable example of looted African art is the Benin Bronzes, sacked from the Kingdom of Benin (now southern Nigeria); thousands of these bronze artworks were taken from the Benin royal palace by the British during the Benin Expedition of 1897.

Other looted African artefacts include the Rosetta Stone, a key to translating hieroglyphs, which was rediscovered during the French campaign in Egypt and Syria before being claimed by the British. Another example is the Maqdala treasures, taken by the British from Ethiopia.

=== 20th century ===
The most significant looting in the 20th century was the Nazi plunder (1933–1945), first primarily of the property of German Jews and subsequently of conquered territories. These acts were legal under Nazi German law but certainly illicit. For details, see § Looting by Nazi Germany, below.

During the 20th century, most plundering of archaeological artefacts was undetected and unpunished. In most countries, there was little or no actual legislation to protect archaeological sites.

- In the United Kingdom and Ireland, the Ancient Monuments Protection Act 1882 introduced the principle of protection for national heritage sites. Subsequent laws have enhanced this protection (most recently in the UK, the Ancient Monuments and Archaeological Areas Act 1979). Nevertheless, the availability of increasingly powerful and accurate metal detectors has led to a surge in nighthawking (theft of archaeological artefacts, from scheduled and unscheduled sites).
- In Spain, since 1978, a framework for legal protection of cultural heritage has been developed.

=== 21st century ===
In the decade of the 2010s there has been several cases of looters with metal detectors in archaeological sites.

== Looting by perpetrator ==
=== Looting by the British Empire ===
The transformation of theft and plunder as an incentive for troops to institutionalized, indiscriminate looting following military conflict can be observed in the wake of British conquest in Asia, Africa and India. According to one scholar, the looting of artifacts for "both personal and institutional reasons" became "increasingly important in the process of "othering" Oriental and African societies and was exemplified in the professionalism of exploration and the growth of ethnographic departments in museums, the new 'temples of Empire'." Looting, not necessarily of art, became an instrument for the projection of power and the British imperial desire to gather and provide information about the "exotic" cultures and primitive tribes. One of the most famous examples is the case of the personal initiative by the British ambassador of removing, with the permission of the local Ottoman authorities, the Elgin Marbles from the Parthenon in Athens; a few years later they were sold to the UK government, which entrusted them to the British Museum. Other examples include the Benin Bronzes, which were looted by the British from the Kingdom of Benin (now Southern Nigeria) in 1897.

Famously, the Rosetta Stone and various other artifacts were taken as war plunder from the French, who had removed them from their Egyptian setting during the French occupation under Napoleon.

=== Looting by France ===
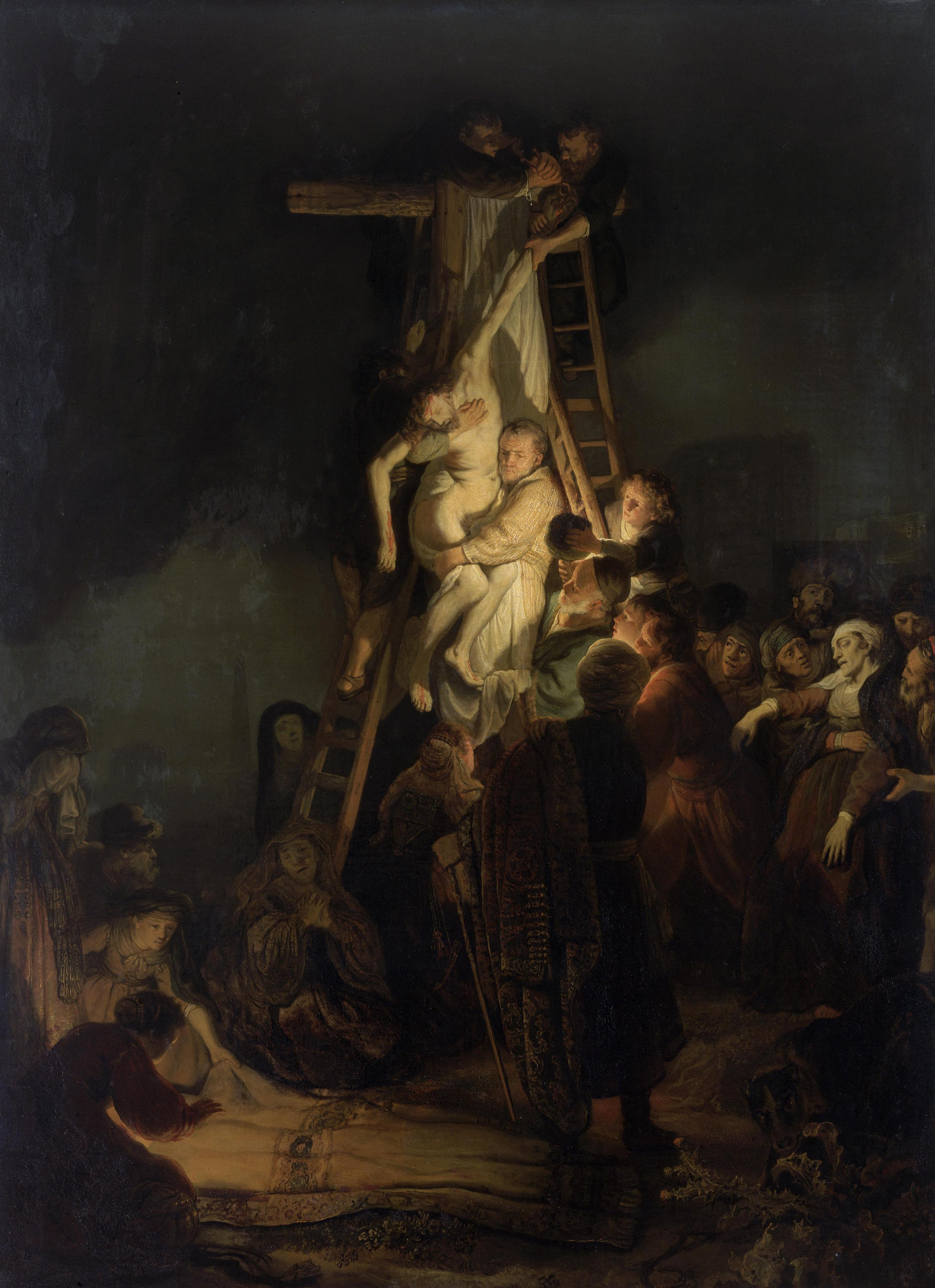
Rembrandt's Descent from the Cross was looted in 1806 by French soldiers from the Landgrave of Hesse-Kassel, Germany; current location: Hermitage, St. Petersburg.

Napoleon's conquests in Europe were followed by a systematic attempt, later more tentatively echoed by Hitler, to take the finest works of art of conquered nations back to the Louvre in Paris for a grand central museum of all Europe. Napoleon boasted:

We will now have all that is beautiful in Italy except for a few objects in Turin and Naples.

Many works were returned after his fall, but many others were not, and remain in France. Many works confiscated from religious institutions under the French occupation now form the backbone of national museums: "Napoleon's art-loot depots became the foundation of Venice's Accademia, Milan's Brera galleries. His brother Louis founded Amsterdam's Rijksmuseum; brother Joseph started Madrid's Prado" (for the Spanish royal collection).

Napoleonic commander and Marechal Nicolas Jean-de-Dieu Soult stole in 1810 six large pictures painted by Murillo in 1668 for the Hospital de la Caridad in Seville. One painting, The Return of the Prodigal Son, is now in the National Gallery of Art, Washington; a second looted painting, The Healing of the Paralytic, is in the National Gallery in London; only two of the original paintings have returned to Seville.

Another French general looted several pictures, including four Claudes and Rembrandt's Descent from the Cross, from the Landgrave of Hesse-Kassel in 1806. The stolen goods were later bought by the Empress Josephine and subsequently by the tsar. Ever since 1918, when Russia signed a peace treaty with Germany and Austria, have German negotiators demanded the return of the paintings. This has been refused; the pictures still remain in the Hermitage.

=== Looting by the Union and Confederate Armies during the American Civil War ===
On 7 November 1863, Edward D. Townsend of the Union army wrote General Order No. 360: "Satisfactory evidence having been produced to the War Department that a bronze equestrian statue, unlawfully taken from a private house in Fredericksburg, at the time of the capture of that place by the Union forces, was the private property of Mr. Douglas Gordon, of that city, it is— .Ordered: That it be restored to Mrs. Annie C. Thomas, the sister of Mr. Gordon, who has made application therefor." Some of Gordon's works of art were recovered through Lafayette C. Baker, chief of the Union secret police.

The United States Congress enacted legislation allowing for claims to be filed for property losses on 4 July 1864. Claims were restricted to loyal citizens.

=== Looting by Nazi Germany ===
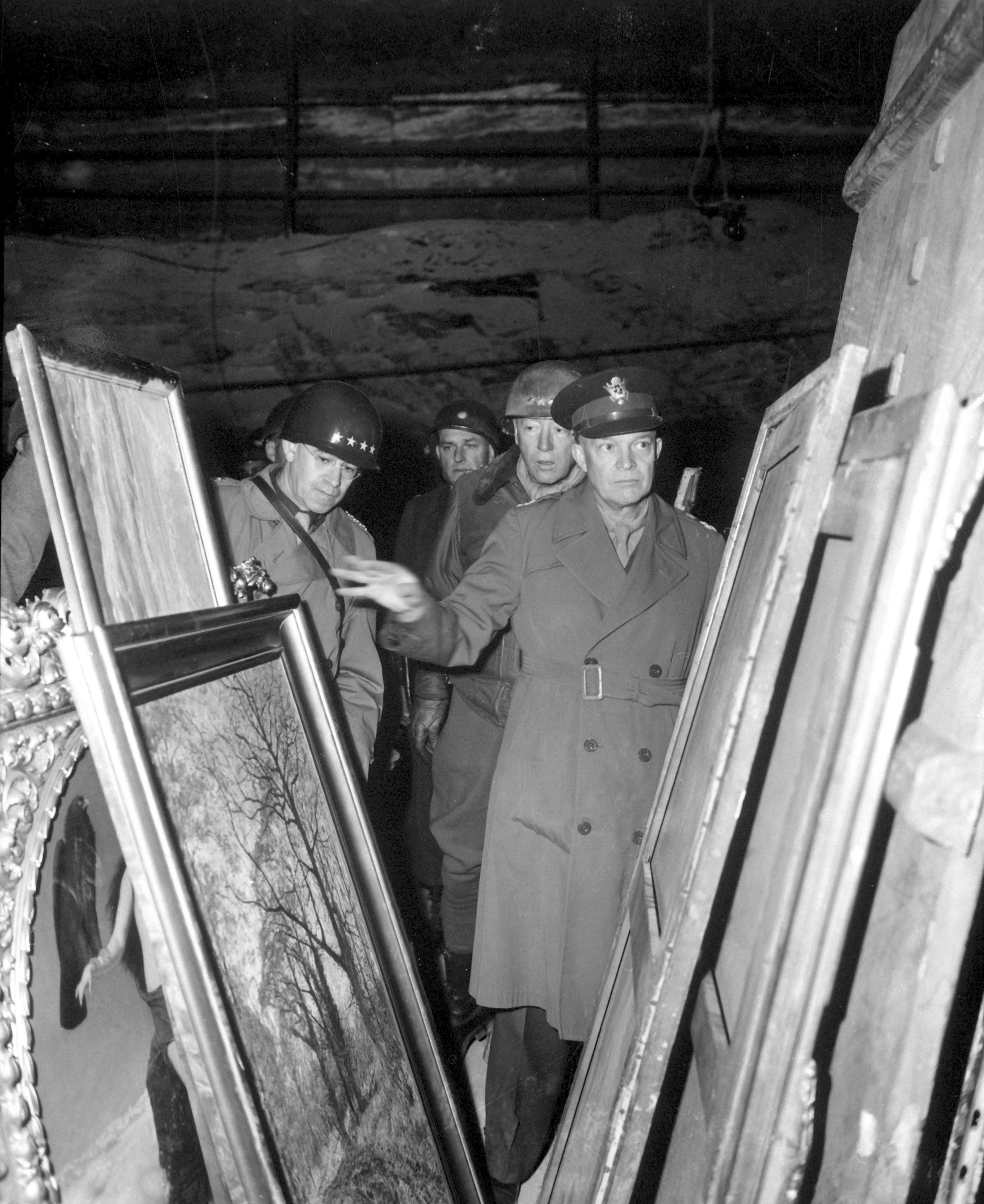
General Dwight D. Eisenhower, Supreme Allied Commander, accompanied by General Omar N. Bradley and Lieutenant General George S. Patton, Jr., inspects art treasures hidden in a salt mine in Germany.

Between 1933 and 1945 the Third Reich engaged in the biggest art theft in history, starting in 1933 with the Jewish population of Germany. During World War II, the Nazis set up special departments "for a limited time for the seizure and securing of objects of cultural value", especially in the Occupied Eastern Territories, including the Baltic states, Ukraine, Hungary and Greece. The Russian imperial residences around St. Petersburg were thoroughly looted and deliberately blown up, so that their restoration is still under way. The Catherine Palace and Peterhof were reduced to smoldering ruins; among the innumerable trophies was the world-famous Amber Room. Medieval churches of Novgorod and Pskov, with their unique 12th-century frescoes, were systematically plundered and reduced to piles of rubble. Major museums around Moscow, including Yasnaya Polyana, Joseph-Volokolamsk Monastery, and New Jerusalem, faced a similar fate, with their architectural integrity irrevocably impaired.

The legal framework and the language of the instructions used by Germany resembles the Lieber Code, but in the Nuremberg Trial proceedings, the victorious Allied armies applied different standards and sentenced the Nazis involved as war criminals. Article 6 of the Charter of the International Military Tribunal of Nuremberg, detailing the Jurisdiction and General Principles, declares the "plunder of public or private property" a war crime, while the Lieber Code and the actions of the Allied armies in the aftermath of World War II allowed or tolerated the looting. The main objective of the looting is made clear by Dr. Muhlmann, responsible for the securing of all Polish art treasures: "I confirm that the art treasures ... would not have remained in Poland in case of a German victory, but they would have been used to complement German artistic property."

One inventory of 39 volumes featuring the looted art and antiques, prepared by the Nazis and discussed during the Nuremberg trials, lists "21,903 Works of Art: 5,281 paintings, pastels, water colors, drawings; 684 miniatures, glass and enamel paintings, illuminated books and manuscripts; 583 sculptures, terra cottas, medallions, and plaques; 2,477 articles of furniture of art historical value; 583 textiles (tapestries, rugs, embroideries, Coptic textiles); 5,825 objects of decorative art (porcelains, bronzes, faience, majolica, ceramics, jewelry, coins, art objects with precious stones); 1,286 East Asiatic art works (bronzes, sculpture, porcelains, paintings, folding screens, weapons); 259 art works of antiquity (sculptures, bronzes, vases, jewelry, bowls, engraved gems, terracottas)."

When Allied forces bombed Germany's cities and historic institutions, Germany "began storing the artworks in salt mines and caves for protection from Allied bombing raids. These mines and caves offered the appropriate humidity and temperature conditions for artworks." Much of this art was recovered by the Allied Monuments, Fine Arts, and Archives Section of the Office of Military Government, United States, as detailed in a 1995 conference in New York and the published proceedings.

=== Looting by the Soviet Union ===
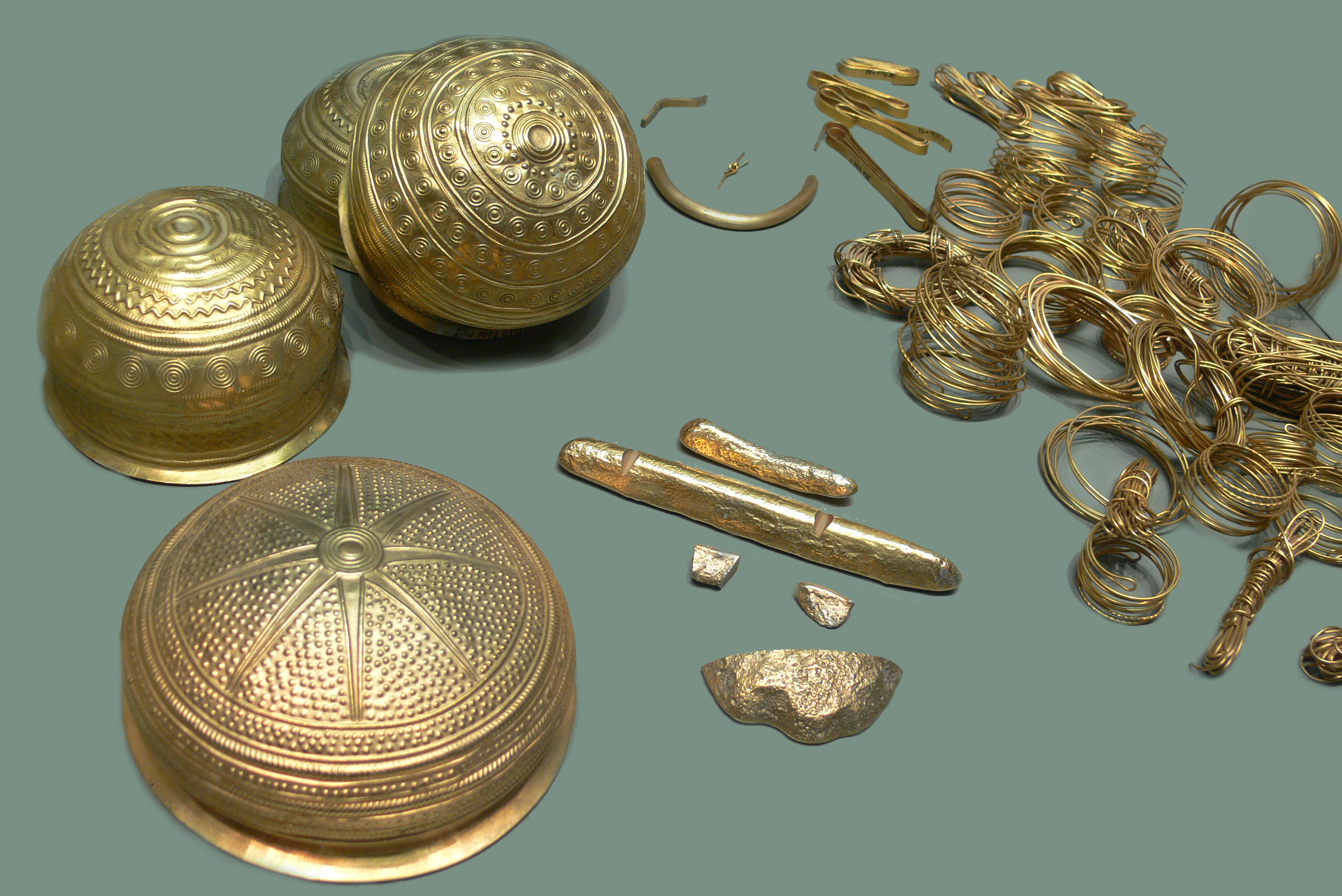
The Eberswalde Hoard from Germany disappeared in 1945 from Berlin and was located in 2004 in a secret depot within Moscow's Pushkin Museum.

The Soviet Union engaged in systematic looting during World War II, particularly of Germany – seeing this as reparations for damage and looting done by Germany in the Soviet Union. The Soviets also looted other occupied territories; for example, looting by Soviets was common on the territories theoretically assigned to its ally, communist Poland. Even Polish Communists were uneasy, as in 1945, the future Chairman of the Polish Council of State, Aleksander Zawadzki, worried that the "raping and looting by the Soviet army would provoke a civil war." Soviet forces had engaged in plunder on the former eastern territories of Germany that were to be transferred to Poland, stripping it of anything of value. A recently recovered masterwork is Gustave Courbet's Femme nue couchée, looted in Budapest, Hungary, in 1945.

Paintings, which were looted by Soviet troops, came also from private German collections by art collectors as Otto Gerstenberg, Bernhard Koehler, Friedrich Carl Siemens (1877–1952), Otto Krebs, Eduard von der Heydt, Eduard Lorenz Lorenz-Meyer or Paul Sachse.

In 1998, and after considerable controversy, Russia passed the Federal Law on Cultural Valuables Displaced to the USSR as a Result of the Second World War and Located on the Territory of the Russian Federation, which allowed Russian institutions to keep art works and museum pieces looted during World War 2.

A number of requests by Poland, who request return of the looted art from Russia was declined. In the most recent request Russian side justified the refusal by the fact that the art was stolen by "the Soviet Union as restitution to compensate for the actions of Nazi Germany", which is again at odds with the fact that Poland and Soviet Union were both part of anti-fascist alliance.

== Case studies ==
A large number of institutions and museums have at various times been subject to both moral claims and legal claims concerning the provenance of their holdings subject to occasional review and challenge. One example of such a case study can be provided by the Metropolitan Museum of Art's reputation which has experienced a series of allegations and lawsuits about its status as an occasional institutional buyer of looted and stolen antiquities. Since the 1990s the Met has been the subject of numerous investigative reports and books critical of the Met's laissez-faire attitude to acquisition. The Met has lost several major lawsuits, notably against the governments of Italy and Turkey, who successfully sought the repatriation of hundreds of ancient Mediterranean and Middle Eastern antiquities, with a total value in the hundreds of millions of dollars.

In the late 1990s, long-running investigations by the Tutela del Patrimonio Culturale (TPC), the art crimes division of the Italian Carabinieri, accused the Metropolitan Museum of acquiring "black market" antiquities. TPC investigations in Italy revealed that many ancient Mediterranean objects acquired from the 1960s to the 1990s had been purchased, via a complex network of front companies and unscrupulous dealers, from the criminal gang led by Italian art dealer Giacomo Medici." The Met is also one of many institutional buyers known to have acquired looted artifacts from a Thai-based British "collector", Douglas Latchford. In 2013, the Met announced that it would repatriate to Cambodia two ancient Khmer statues, known as "The Kneeling Attendants", which it had acquired from Latchford (in fragments) in 1987 and 1992. A spokesperson for the Met stated that the museum had received "dispositive" evidence that the objects had been looted from Koh Ker and illegally exported to the US.

In addition to the ongoing investigations by the Italian police (TPC), lawsuits brought by the Governments of Italy, Turkey and Cambodia against the Metropolitan Museum of Art contend that the acquisition of the Euphronius krater may have demonstrated a pattern of less than rigorous investigation into the origin and legitimate provenance of highly desirable antiquities for the museum's collections. Examples include, the Cloisters Cross, a large Romanesque cross carved from walrus ivory, the Karun Treasure, also known as the Lydian Hoard, a collection of 200 gold, silver, bronze and earthenware objects, dating from the 7th Century BCE, and part of a larger haul of some 450 objects looted by local tomb robbers from four ancient royal tombs near Sardis, in Turkey in 1966–67. After a six-year legal battle that reportedly cost the Turkish government UK£25 million the case ended dramatically after it was revealed that the minutes of the Met's own acquisition committee described how a curator had actually visited the looted burial mounds in Turkey to confirm the authenticity of the objects. The Met was forced to concede that staff had known the objects were stolen when it bought them, and the collection was repatriated to Turkey in 1993.

The Morgantina treasure is a hoard of ornate Hellenistic silverware dated 3rd century BC, valued at perhaps up to US$100 million, acquired by the Met in the early 1980s. It was later shown to have been looted from the Morgantina archaeological site in Sicily. After a protracted lawsuit, the Met conceded that it was looted, and agreed in 2006 to repatriate it to Sicily, with the Met stating in 2006 that the repatriation "redresses past improprieties in the acquisitions process".

== Cases of repatriation ==
=== The Samarkand Codex of the Quran of Uthman ===
One of the earliest cases in world history of formerly colonized peoples reclaiming cultural property taken during imperial conquest explicitly citing the principle of decolonization is the Bolsheviks' repatriation of the Samarkand Kufic Quran, one of the oldest surviving Quran manuscripts and an important Islamic relic. In 1868, during the Russian imperial conquest of Central Asia, the Quran was forcibly removed from the Khoja Ahrar madrassa in Samarkand by the Russian army under Major General Alexander Konstantinovich Abramov and taken to the Imperial Public Library in Saint Petersburg. After the February Revolution, the National Assembly of the Muslims of Inner Russia and Siberia unsuccessfully petitioned the Provisional Government to transfer the Quran to them. Following the October Revolution, various Muslim organizations from across the former Russian Empire petitioned the Bolsheviks for the return of the Quran, and Vladimir Lenin, Joseph Stalin, and Anatoly Lunacharsky agreed to "repatriate" the Quran successively to the National Assembly of the Muslims of Inner Russia and Siberia in Ufa in December 1917 and the Turkestani Muslims associated with the Jadid Islamic enlightenment movement in Tashkent in July 1923.

=== The Menil Collection and 13th-century frescoes ===
One case of repatriation for the Church of Cyprus is associated with the Menil Collection, based in Houston, Texas. This particular collection is one of the most important collections of icons, which have originated in areas such as Greece, the Balkans, and Russia and span a diverse range of times from the 6th to 18th centuries. Dominique de Menil, the founder of the Menil Collection, found the three 13th-century Byzantine frescoes for sale in 1983, by which time they had been separated into 38 different pieces. De Menil bought the frescoes on behalf of the Church of Cyprus, with whom she made an agreement to exhibit the frescoes in a purpose-built chapel until 2012; the collection offered to keep the frescoes longer, but the Archbishop of Cyprus has instead agreed to have an iconographer recreate the frescoes on the Houston chapel's dome and apse and give the Houston chapel a 19th- and a 20th-century icon in return for the safekeeping of the 13th-century icons.

The original Cypriot chapel in the Church of Saint Euphemianos in the village of Lysi, in the northern part of Cyprus was a small limestone structure, with a central dome and pointed barrel vaults; the original was mostly used for prayer because of its small size. When the Menil Collection was granted temporary possession of the frescoes, it constructed a chapel to house the frescoes and keep them safe. This specially built chapel was designed by De Menil's son, François de Menil, who studied traditional Byzantine architecture and spatial arrangement from the original chapel at Lysi; the layout and the placement of the mosaics mirrors the arrangement from the original chapel. The interior of the chapel has black walls which are illuminated to create a sense of vastness and infinity; the black walls help to focus the attention of the viewer on the frescoes and create a divine experience for the viewer.

Icons are important because they depict images of greater significance, and they are used to instruct and inspire worship. These particular Cypriot frescoes have been identified with three different religious images: Christ Pantocrator surrounded by a frieze of angels, the Preparation of the Throne attended by the Virgin Mary and Saint John the Baptist, and the Virgin Mary flanked by Archangels Michael and Gabriel. The collection announced that 4 March 2012 would be the last day to see the frescoes in their place in Houston after being on long-term exhibit for 15 years. The frescoes in this collection are the largest intact Byzantine frescoes that can be seen in the Western Hemisphere.

=== Boy George and the Gold Icon of Christ ===
One Cypriot artifact that has been found was in the home of pop singer Boy George, also known as George O'Dowd. The artifact, a golden icon of Christ, had been hanging above the singer's fireplace for 26 years, until the piece was recognized by a patron watching a TV interview of O'Dowd, which was taped in the singer's living room. The icon is thought to have been stolen around 1974, during the chaotic time of the Turkish invasion of the Northern part of Cyprus, and there is documentation to believe that the icon was once housed in The Church of St. Charalambos in Neo Chorio-Kythrea. O'Dowd was unaware that the icon had been stolen because he bought the artifact "with good faith" from an art dealer in 1985. The singer is glad that the piece is going back to its original home because he wants everyone to see it on display in its rightful place. However, it will not be going back to the original Church in the northern part of Cyprus; it is being held in Brussels, Belgium, and it will return to Cyprus at a later date when The Church of Cyprus has an appropriate space in which it can be stored. This case has contributed to the Church of Cyprus and their efforts to repatriate "stolen spiritual treasures" that have come from their homeland of Cyprus.

=== Peg Goldberg and the Kanakaria mosaics ===
This case study outlines the events that occurred in 1989 between Peg Goldberg, a local art dealer in Indianapolis, Indiana, and the Church of Cyprus when Goldberg gained "ownership" and then tried to sell Cypriot mosaics from the 6th century. These mosaics have been looted from the Church of the Virgin of Kanakaria in the village of Lythrangomi in Northern Cyprus after surviving the 8th and 9th century. These mosaics had survived the 8th- and 9th-century iconoclasm in the Byzantine world and were considered to be finer than other mosaics, even the mosaics found in Ravenna, Italy and the mosaics in St. Catherine's monastery in Sinai. The Kanakaria mosaics were cut into pieces when they were looted from the original church, and Peg Goldberg was able to purchase four segments of these early mosaics from Aydin Dikmen. These mosaics are important to the cultural, artistic, and religious heritage of Cyprus because they are some of the few remaining Byzantine mosaics from the island; when and how these mosaics were taken from Cyprus is unknown because there is documentation to show that they were still intact in 1976, two years after the initial invasion by the Turkish troops.

These mosaics first came into the view of the Church of Cyprus when Goldberg approached the Getty Museum to purchase the mosaic pieces. The Getty Museum recognized them as the lost Kanakaria mosaics and informed Cyprus that they were in the United States. Shortly afterward, the Church of Cyprus filed a claim at the district court to try to reclaim the mosaics. The federal court in Indiana made a verdict in favor of the Church of Cyprus, and the mosaics were returned in 1991 to the Byzantine Museum in Nicosia, Cyprus. The verdict showed that Goldberg could not own the pieces because Dikmen had stolen the mosaics and had no right to pass on the ownership of the stolen mosaics. Goldberg stated that the pieces had been bought "in good faith" from a "Turkish antiquities dealer" who found the mosaics in an abandoned church, but the judge ruled that not looking into the background and workings of the dealer was unacceptable because it was her responsibility to look into the people she was working with. This case called in the multilateral treaty of the 1970 UNESCO Convention on the Means of Prohibiting and Preventing the Illicit Import, Export, and Transfer of Ownership of Cultural Property, which calls for all available parties to help recover and return items that have been requested by the country of origin; using this international decree helped to show the importance of these artifacts which needed to be sent to their home land of Cyprus. People have been happy with this verdict for the Kanakaria case because they want others to realize that cultural heritage of the world is not for sale, and hopefully discourage further selling of looted art in the international market.

The mosaic pieces that were involved in the Kanakaria case have four different religious images. They depict Jesus as a young boy, the archangel Michael, Matthew and James; the final two are images of apostles from the 1st century. The mosaics were named after the Church in which they were placed originally around 530. These mosaics have fallen into destruction because of the damage that they experienced through the process of removal from the church, shipping around the world, and during the restoration work that Goldberg commissioned. It is unlikely that these mosaics will ever be reinstalled in their original home, even if there are changes in the political situation on Cyprus, because they would most likely not make it through the re-installation process in the state that they are currently in.

== See also ==
- Antiquities trade
- Art theft
- Art theft and looting during World War II
- Benin Bronzes
- Interpol
- List of artworks with contested provenance
- List of missing treasure
- Polish Crown Jewels
- Royal Casket
- United States restitution to the Soviet Union
- War loot
- M-Aktion
