= Neochori, Cyprus =

Neo Chorio is the name of two towns in Cyprus :

- Neo Chorio, Paphos, in Paphos District
- Neo Chorio, Nicosia, in Nicosia District
