= Lod Mosaic =

Roman mosaic found in Israel

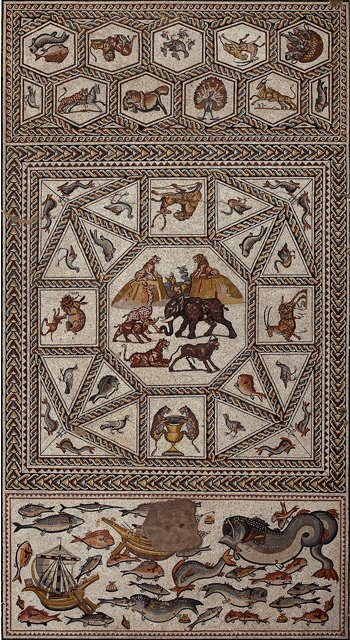
- Year: 3rd century CE
- Medium: Mosaic
- Dimensions: 9.1 m × 17 m (30 ft × 57 ft); 180 m^{2} (1,900 sq ft)
- Location: The Shelby White and Leon Levy Lod Mosaic Archaeological Center, Lod, Israel
- Coordinates: 31°57′19.5″N 34°54′12.9″E
- Website: lodmosaic.co.il

The Lod Mosaic is a mosaic floor dated to ca. 300 CE discovered in 1996 in the Israeli town of Lod. Believed to have been created for a private villa, it is one of the largest (180 m^{2}) and best-preserved mosaic floors uncovered in the country. It depicts land animals, fish and two Roman ships. It was restored in the labs of the Israel Antiquities Authority (IAA). After an overseas tour of several years it opened in the purpose-built Shelby White and Leon Levy Lod Mosaic Archaeological Center in June 2022.

== History ==
The mosaic was discovered in 1996 by construction workers widening HeKhalutz Street in Lod. Archaeologist Miriam Avissar of the Israel Antiquities Authority was called to the site. The mosaic was put on public view over a single weekend and 30,000 people traveled to Lod to see it. It was then reburied while funding was sought for its conservation. In 2009, it was temporarily unveiled for one weekend.

After the excavation of the mosaic was done, the mosaic was glued with cotton fabric. The mosaic was then cut from its bedding and split into smaller fragments in order for safe movement. These pieces were transported on wooden platforms to laboratories of the Israel Antiquities Authority (IAA) in Jerusalem in which the conservation process continued for approximately two years.

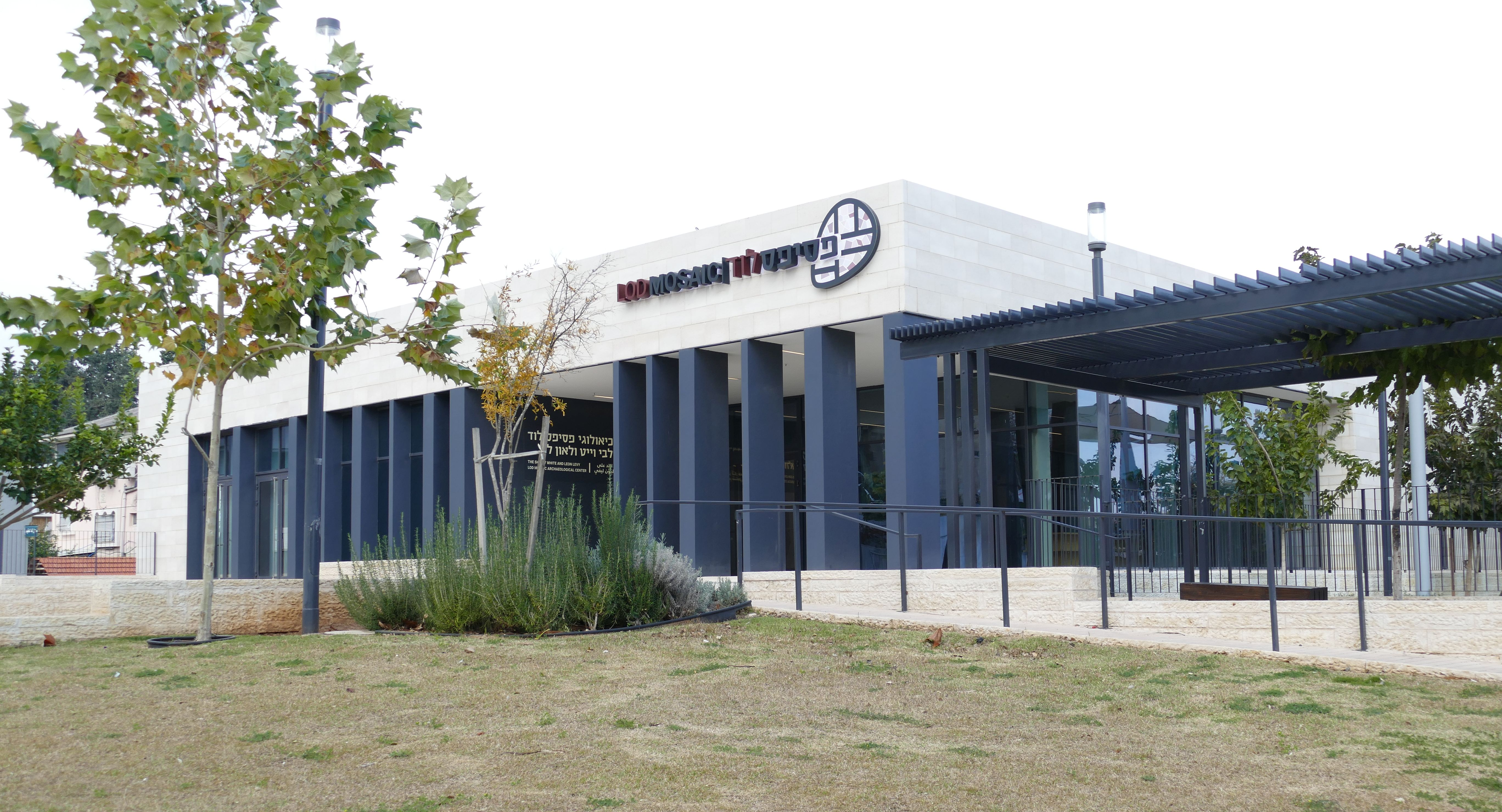
Shelby White and Leon Levy Lod Mosaic Center

The Leon Levy Foundation and Shelby White, wife of Leon Levy and Chairman of the Friends of the Israel Antiquities Authority, funded the conservation of the mosaic and the establishment of the Shelby White and Leon Levy Lod Mosaic Center. The mosaic began its international exhibition tour to eleven museums in 2010, including the Metropolitan Museum of Arts and the Louvre, among others. While the work was supposed to return after a couple of years, the mosaic continued to circulate elsewhere, partially due to inadequate housing for the work in Lod. In 2017, construction began on The Shelby White and Leon Levy Lod Mosaic Center, which the work returned to in 2020. The museum opened in June of 2022.

Among the people in Lod, who many of which live in poor economic conditions, that the creation of the museum will stimulate tourism and economic growth to the town. Lod's mayor, Yair Revivo, at the ceremony of laying the museum's cornerstone, spoke:

Very so on, our dream in the city of mosaic of cultures will materialize when one of the most important museums will be open, and will place Lod on the world tourism map. We will provide for visitors from Israel and from around the world to view this incredible treasure here in Lod. ... Old Lod is rejuvenated!

Subsequent excavations revealed additional smaller mosaic floors, one of which, that was south of the Lod Mosaic, planned to be displayed in the same museum as the main mosaic.

== Description and analysis ==
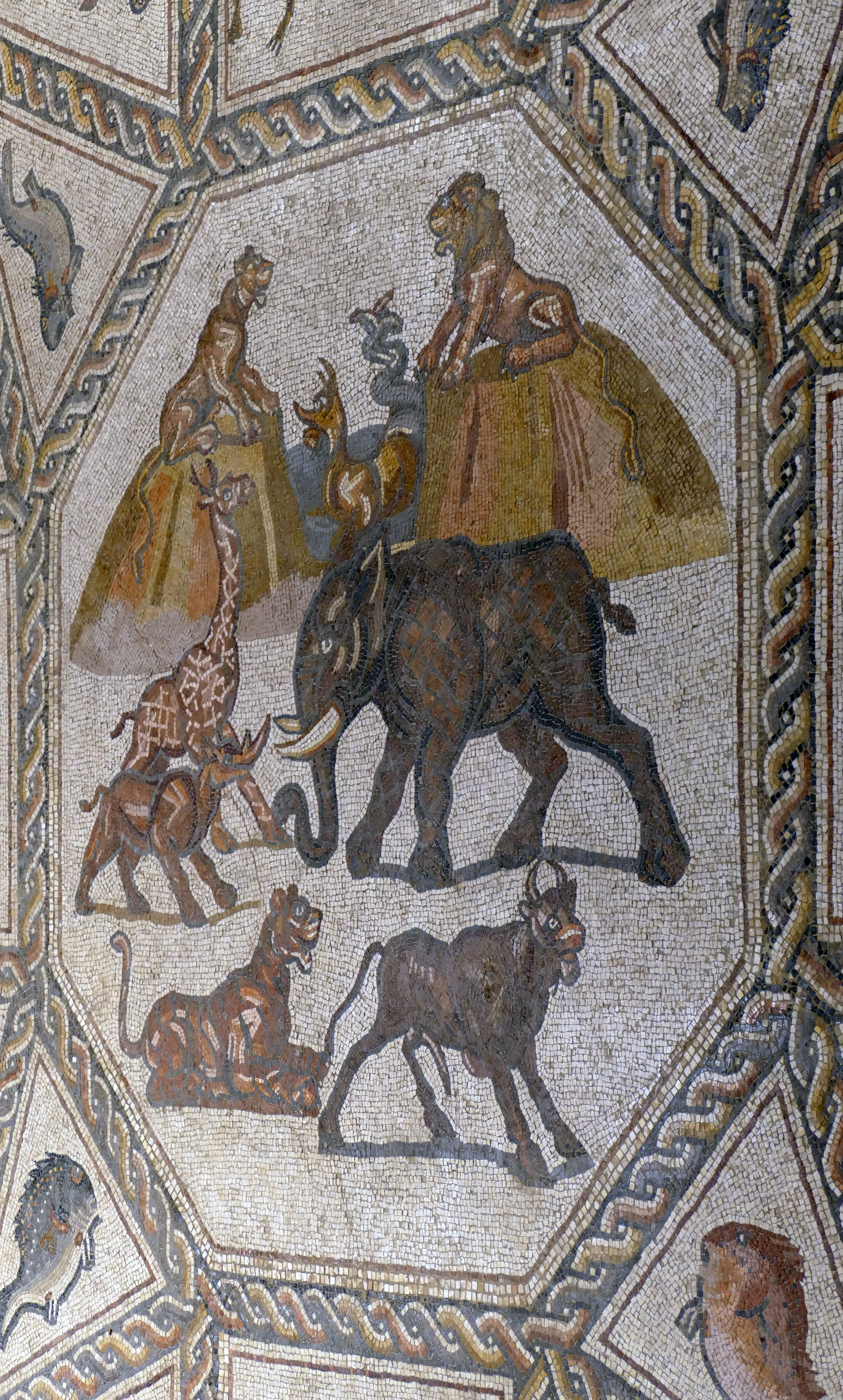
Lod Mosaic central detail featuring land animals

The mosaic covers an area of 180 m^{2} (1,900 sq ft) and is 57 ft long and 30 ft wide. The mosaic dates to the third century CE, or to somewhere around the year 300, given that debris covering the mosaic contained datable remains from both the third and fourth centuries. The patterns depict birds, fish, animals and plants, in addition to providing detailed images of Roman-era ships. However, the mosaic also prominently feature rhinoceroses and giraffes, which were not common in ancient art. Mythical beings are also portrayed. Nothing is written on the mosaic; inscriptions are common in Roman-era mosaics from public buildings, so it is assumed that the mosaic was most likely part of a private villa. The mosaic's design takes inspiration from north African mosaics.

Unusual for a mosaic floor of this age, the mosaic is in near-perfect condition. The exception is damage to one of the two ships depicted, done when an Ottoman-era cesspit was dug into the mosaic. Despite the damage, students of maritime history have been able to glean a great deal of information from the images. The ships are of the navis oneraria type, Roman merchant ships typically displacing 80-150 tons, used to carry such commodities as garum and grain from Egypt to Rome.

Archaeologists Elie Haddad and Miriam Avissar suggest that the absence of human figures, rare in Roman-era mosaics, may indicate that the mosaic was commissioned by a Jew who observed the Biblical prohibition of graven images. They further suggest that it may have been commissioned as a kind of ex-voto, a thank offering in fulfillment of a vow made upon being delivered from grave danger, in this case, shipwreck. Other maritime historians demur, but Haddad and Avissar point to what appear to be torn ropes, a broken mast and damaged steering oars, together with the central placement of the damaged ship in the mosaic and the fact that it is apparently about to be swallowed by a giant fish as an artists representation of disaster at sea.

== See also ==
- Archaeology of Israel
- Roman mosaic
