= Shelby White =

American philanthropist

- Born: 1938 (age 87–88); Brooklyn, New York City
- Education: Mount Holyoke College; Columbia University
- Occupations: Investor, art collector, philanthropist
- Spouse: Leon Levy

Shelby White (born 1938) is an American investor, art collector, and philanthropist. She serves on the board of the Metropolitan Museum of Art and is a founding trustee of the Leon Levy Foundation.

== Early life ==
Shelby Ann Baier was born in 1938 and grew up in Brooklyn. She received a bachelor's degree from Mount Holyoke College and a master's from Columbia University. After college, she married investment banker Rodney L. White, who died in 1969.

In the 1970s, White married Leon Levy, an American investor and philanthropist, and she and her husband developed an interest in antiquities and started bidding at New York auctions in 1975.

== Career ==
White began her career as an author and financial journalist and wrote for publications including Forbes, Town and Country and The New York Times. In 1992, White authored the book What Every Woman Should Know About Her Husband’s Money. In 1977, White authored one of the first articles on sexual harassment in the workplace. Her ground-breaking “The Office Pass” in Across the Board magazine reported that sexual harassment had become a major feminist issue in business, the press and the courts.

Over the next several decades, White and Levy accumulated a substantial collection of objects from different time periods and international origins. Many of the pieces in their collection are on display at the Metropolitan Museum of Art. She also serves on the Director's Roundable at the Morgan Library & Museum.

In the early 1990s, White and Levy agreed to send 16 artifacts to the British Museum upon their deaths, after having been shown evidence that the objects may have been surreptitiously removed from Roman ruins in Icklingham, England. In 2008, White returned 9 pieces that the Italian government suggested had been questionably exported.

The Levy-White collection has been scrutinized for looted objects: in a 2000 article, archaeologists David Gill and Christopher Chippindale stated that 93 percent of the works at the exhibition Glories of the Past: Ancient Art from the Shelby White and Leon Levy Collection had no known provenance.

Upon search warrants issued by the Manhattan District Attorney’s Office on 28 June 2021, and April 27, 2022, objects were seized from White's Manhattan home and were returned to Turkey and Italy, these objects constituting "evidence of criminal possession of stolen property in the first, second, third, and fourth degrees, as well as of a conspiracy to commit those crimes" In 2021 and 2022, investigators from Manhattan District Attorney Alvin Bragg's office returned 71 artifacts from the Levy-White collection to multiple countries, including Yemen, Turkey and Italy. The Office of Manhattan District Attorney General seized 89 stolen antiquities, valued at $69 million and originating from 10 different countries, and returned some of them to Turkey and Yemen.

In May 2023, Chinese antiquities loaned to the Metropolitan Museum of Art by Shelby White were seized and returned to the Chinese Consulate, and an alabaster bull looted from Uruk was returned to Iraq. In March, Bragg's office “thank(ed) Shelby White for her assistance and cooperation with our investigation.”

In 1995, White and her husband made a donation of $20 million for the renovation and expansion of the Met's Greek and Roman Galleries; the Met's largest cash donation up to that time. Philippe de Montebello, the Met's director, said the gift “moves us significantly toward finally making the broad spectrum of our Greek and Roman holdings accessible to all visitors.”

In 2000, White was controversially appointed to the Cultural Property Advisory Committee, a government organization formed in 1983 to help combat illicit international trade of antiquities.

After her husband's death in 2003, White established the Leon Levy Foundation, which has awarded more than half a billion dollars in total grants since its founding. Through the Foundation, White has funded her philanthropic efforts including a $25 million donation to New York City parks in 2008; $3.25 million for an addition to the Brooklyn Public Library in 2010; more than $10 million since 2007 to nearly two dozen institutions from the National Park Service to the New York Philharmonic to identify, preserve and digitize archival collections so that they are available online to scholars and the public; $13.5 million in 2011 for the founding, in partnership with the Bahamas National Trust, of the 30-acre Leon Levy Native Plant Preserve on the Island of Eleuthera; $3.7 million in 2007 for the creation of the Leon Levy Center for Biography at the CUNY Graduate Center, which the foundation further endowed with a $10 million gift in 2024; and $200 million to NYU in 2006 for the creation of the Institute for the Study of the Ancient World for doctoral and post doctoral students that NYU President John Sexton said, would “chart a new course that will transform the way antiquity is conceived and taught, without geographic or cultural boundaries.”

In 2017, White received the Carnegie Medal of Philanthropy, a private philanthropic award established in 2001.

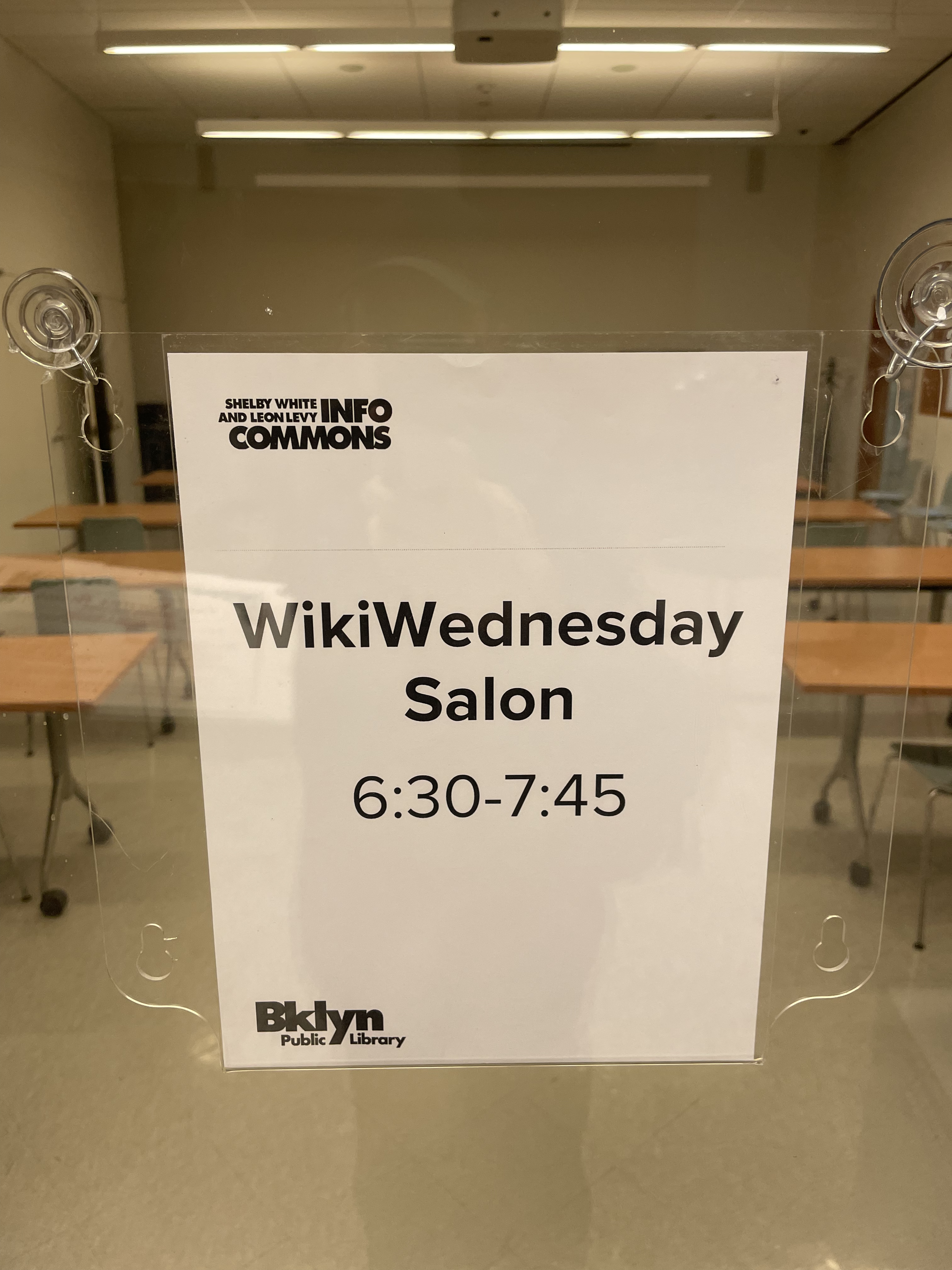
Shelby White and Leon Levy Information Commons room at the Central Library of the Brooklyn Public Library
