= Russian cultural property law =

Laws surrounding Russian cultural valuables

After the Second World War in 1945, issues surrounding wartime loss and compensation started to arise. Cultural valuables were taken from Germany and placed in the Soviet Union. Years later, at the break up of the USSR, the said cultural valuables came to attention as the issue of ownership arose. Following, the debates between the Russian Duma and the Yeltsin government began, with the Duma focusing on compensation to Russia for wartime loss, and Yeltsin focusing on maintaining international relationships and agreements. Arising from the debate, were many struggles, but ultimately the enactment of the Federal Law on Cultural Valuables Displaced to the USSR as a Result of the Second World War and Located on the Territory of the Russian Federation.

== Background ==
At the end of the Second World War in 1945, armed forces of the Soviet Union transferred cultural valuables (such as books, art, artifacts, etc.) from Germany, through organized collection in what some would argue as retaliation, and others as compensation for the wartime loss of cultural property the Soviet Union suffered, or through unorganized looting. Since the end of the War the existence of such valuables were kept secret, and their existence was denied. In 1991 when the collapse of the Soviet Union occurred, and the rise of the Russian Federation began, a number of such hidden cultural artifacts were recognized and discussion of repatriation and ownership was allowed to occur publicly. Many artifacts remain in the Russian Federation, and advocates for retaining them cite the losses incurred by the Soviet Union as justifying the taking of plunder. In total during World War II, nearly thirty million Soviet people died as a result of prison camps, torture, starvation and cold blood murder. The USSR suffered a huge wartime loss, not only through cultural property but also by the deaths of millions of people.

== Debate ==
=== Yeltsin in Favour of Restitution 1992 ===
In June 1992, a Decree of the Russian Government created what was called the State Commission for Restitution of Cultural Valuables, which was to decide issues related to restitution. However, the Commission did very little and was at a halt by June 1993, and then was later abolished by March 2001. Also, in 1992, there were many bilateral cultural agreements with a number of countries such as, Belgium, Bulgaria, Denmark, Germany, Greece, Hungary, Luxembourg, Poland, and the United Kingdom for mutual restitution of displaced cultural valuables; none of which were talked about in the Constitutional Court ruling in 1999 about the constitutionality of the Russian 1998 law, where international agreements were to be put above domestic laws. However, in June 1992 there was the only restitution of books to the west by Russia; there was 600 Dutch books that were returned to the Netherlands. But, this is only a small portion of the estimated 30,000 Dutch books that had arrived in the USSR. The idea of restitution did not last long, and soon turned into demands for compensation.

=== Duma halts restitution 1994 ===
Starting in 1994, the idea of restitution had completely come to a stop, and the debates started about constructing a law on said cultural valuables. Duma deputies are responsible for the start of the debate by stating that there is lack of international laws and the inadequacy of domestic legislation to justify its refusal to permit further restitution. This came about when Duma deputies refused the return of French archives that were a part of a 1992 agreement. Demands for compensation from wartime loss and destruction started to arise from the Duma deputies, suggesting that other countries should be charged storage fees for what was held in Russia secretly for over 50 years; and further that the only possible restitution of cultural valuables that would occur to other nations was in exchange for Russian cultural valuables, because the deputies at this point were arguing that many of the plundered cultural valuables from Russia were being held across the ocean from the United States Zone of Occupation in Germany. Further, with the support of some legal specialists and Russian legislators argue that all the cultural valuables that were brought to Moscow under government orders were all done so legally. But, nevertheless there is the other side of the debate, which is also supported by the Yeltsin government, who argue for compromise and internationally appropriate solutions.

=== Duma Proposes Law 1995 and 1996 ===
For six years the debate continued. In January 1995 a large international conference was held in New York City titled "Spoils of War", where the international context about the issues surrounding cultural valuables plundered or misplaced at the end of the Second World War came to light. Firstly, it was important to note that no allied agreement that was made ever stated that works of art or other cultural property could be used for compensation purposes. Efforts such as what was done by the British and the Americans, where they carried out an elaborate program of restitution to countries of origin were discussed. Stories such as the United States had returned over half a million cultural items to the Soviet Union, but Russians were not aware of this, were among many topics discussed. On an international level, legal concepts and precedents existed during the time of the plundering from Germany in 1945, such as the Hague Convention of 1907. Specifically Article 56 of the Convention "forbids the seizure, damaging and destruction of property of educational and art institutions, … and articles of scientific and artistic value belonging to individuals and societies as well as to the State". Such international law did not stop Stalin from ordering the seizure of cultural valuables as compensatory reparations from Germany. However, Stalin's order is still followed by the Russian position 50 years later, as they would argue that these transfers (seizures) were carried out legally after the war as compensation. On the other side such a point of view is wrong because Russia is not in compliance with international law regarding the protection of cultural property. Despite the ongoing debate and Russia's failure to restitute cultural valuables to other European countries, Russia had an interest in becoming a member of the Council of Europe. In order for Russia to become a member they had to sign a statement of intent in order to be admitted, which they did and gained admission in late 1995. Russia at this time agreed to negotiate claims for the return of cultural property to other European countries, and to return property that was transferred to Moscow in 1945, in a rapid manner. Surprisingly, nothing to this agreement ever occurred or was of any mention in the Russian press; and less than a year later in May 1996 the Duma passed the first reading of the proposed law nationalizing the spoils of war. The law emphasized compensation to Russia for wartime loss.

=== Yeltsin's Position, July 1996 ===
It was not long after, in early July 1996, the law was passed almost unanimously, making other European countries very hostile about the law. The passage started a slew of diplomatic protests, and as a result the Russian Upper House, the Council of the Federation, rejected the law strongly because of the outcry from the Yeltsin administration. Boris Yeltsin, president of the Russian Federation at the time, and his administration stood strong behind this argument for rejecting the law on the basis that it would conflict with numerous international agreements.

=== Duma Passes Law, March 1997 ===
Nevertheless, the law continued to gain support from other nationalist-oriented parties, and the push for the passage of the law continued. The chair of the Duma Committee on Culture, Nikolai Gubenko, continued to stress that the law was a must, on the basis that all the cultural property that was transported to what was the Soviet Union was all done so legally according to allied agreements, and that the law is way of providing justice to the loved ones, nearly 30 million, that are no longer with us due to the horrific outcomes of the war. With more gained support, and a slightly revised law, the Duma again almost unanimously passed the law on 5 February, 1997, and was further passed by the upper house, the Council of Federation on 5 March, 1997.

=== Yeltsin Vetoes the Law, March 1997 ===
Sticking to what he believed, and despite the ongoing support for the law, President Yeltsin vetoed the law on 18 March, 1997. Making his position clear in his official message to the Duma, Yeltsin stood firm that the law was in contradiction of the Constitution. Further Yeltsin pointed out that the law went against Russian bilateral agreements with other European countries.

== Constitutional Court ruling ==
Notwithstanding the President's power to veto the law, the Council of the Federation overrode Yeltsin's veto, with a vote of 141 to 37 in favor of the law on 14 May, 1997. Regardless of the fact that the Council of the Federation overrode Yeltsin's veto, he still refused to sign the law, and further cited allegations of voting irregularities; and repeated his position that the law conflicted Russia's international legal obligations. President Yeltsin was forced to sign the law by the Constitutional Court in a decision on 6 April, 1998. The Constitutional Court ruled that they were unable to consider the constitutionality of the law before the President signed it. So, on 15 April, 1998, President Yeltsin signed the law making it officially Federal Law. The Law did return to Constitutional Court in 1999 for review on the basis of unconstitutionality, contradiction of Russia's international legal obligation and alleged irregular voting practices. The ruling of 20 July, 1999 did rule in fact that parts of the law were unconstitutional and that parts of the voting process were violated; but despite these findings the law was still validated and found not in conflict with the Constitution. The ruling further stated that the cultural valuables that were relocated to now what is known as Russia at the end of the Second World War should not be returned to the former aggressor countries and should remain in Russia as a form of compensation. The law was sent back to the Duma for amendments to be made in November 1999, and then finally 25 May, 2000, the Federal Law received the Presidential signature from the then President Vladimir Putin.

== The law ==
The Federal Law on Cultural Valuables Displaced to the USSR as a Result of World War II and Located on the Territory of the Russian Federation consists of six Chapters and twenty-five Articles. The Law is aimed at governing cultural valuables displaced to know what is known as Russia. The fundamental goals of the Federal Law are "to protect said valuables from misappropriation and prevent their illegal export beyond the borders of the Russian Federation as well as their unlawful transfer to whomsoever; to establish the necessary legal bases for treating said cultural valuables as partial compensation for the damage caused to the cultural property of the Russian Federation as a result of the plunder and destruction of its cultural valuables by Germany and its war allies during World War II; to protect the interests of the Russian Federation in the settlement of disputed issues with foreign states concerning said cultural valuables through consistent compliance with the principle of mutuality; to provide a possibility for acquainting citizens of the Russian Federation and foreign citizens, including specialists in the fields of education, science and culture, with said cultural valuables; and to create favorable conditions for the continuous development of international cooperation in the fields of education, science and culture".

== International criticism ==
The Law enacted by the Russian Federation on displaced cultural valuables, has been nothing but criticized on an international level. A Hungarian specialist cited a large number of issues on how the Russian law violates international law and treaties. But more specifically, emphasized that Hungary is entitled to the restitution of Hungarian property removed to the USSR as a result of the Second World War. Further, similar feelings were expressed by a Ukrainian specialist, who argues that Ukraine and other former Soviet republics should have a say in determining the fate of their cultural valuables, on the basis of international norms and democratic principles. A specific criticism of the law is the notion of a limitation period. This is the idea that a claim must be made within 18 months of the information about a specific cultural valuable is published in an appropriate federal agency publication. This strikes a lot of concerns because who decides and what is an adequate publication, and after the 18 months what happens. In 2009, a Ministry of Culture legal specialist wrote that the passage of the law "would appear as a unilateral Russian rejection of its international obligations and evoke a negative impact on international relations of the Russian Federation with various European governments". In June 2013, news reports illustrated that the controversy about the appropriation of German artefacts by the USSR was still on-going between Germany and Russia. During a visit to St Petersburg, Angela Merkel, chancellor of Germany, criticized an exhibition at the Hermitage Museum that contained a number of valuables that were stolen from Germany. President Putin declared that the issue was very sensitive and that both sides would continue to talk to resolve the issue.
