= Leon Levy =

American financier (1925–2003)

- Born: September 13, 1925; New York City, New York, U.S.
- Died: April 6, 2003 (aged 77); New York City, New York, U.S.
- Education: City College of New York
- Spouse: Shelby White

Leon Levy (September 13, 1925 – April 6, 2003) was an American investor, mutual fund manager, and philanthropist. At his death, Forbes magazine called him “a Wall Street investment genius,” who helped create both mutual funds and hedge funds.

== Early life and education ==
Born to a Jewish family, Levy attended Townsend Harris High School and studied psychology at City College of New York. After serving in the U.S. Army, he began working as a research analyst. He was strongly influenced in his business approach by his father, Jerome Levy, an economist and business executive who emphasized the role corporate profits play in charting the economy's direction.

== Investment career ==
In 1956 he became a partner of Oppenheimer & Co. Inc, then in 1959 Levy co-founded the Oppenheimer mutual funds. There he started dozens of mutual funds that, at his death, had grown to manage more than $120 billion. In 1982, he sold both companies to the U.K.'s Mercantile House for $162 million and co-founded Odyssey Partners, a private investment partnership. It grew to be a $3 billion hedge fund before it was dissolved in 1997.

== Wealth and philanthropy ==
In 1986, to honor his father, he founded the Jerome Levy Economics Institute, now the Levy Institute, at Bard College in Annandale-on-Hudson, New York. The Levy Institute has established itself as a sponsor of extensive work in Keynesian and post-Keynesian economics. In the last year of his life, Levy commuted up the Hudson River from New York City to teach a class at the Levy Institute, "Contemporary Developments in Finance", in which he focused on his belief that investing is as much a psychological as it is an economic act.

When he died in his late seventies, Levy was estimated to be worth a billion dollars, though his personal wealth might have been substantially higher were it not for his philanthropic interests.

In the final year of his life Levy taught a course "Seminar in Contemporary Developments of Finance" at the Levy Economics Institute of Bard College during the spring 2003 semester.

Levy's philanthropy began in the 1950s, when he established the Jerome Levy Foundation, which still exists, giving grants to human rights and land preservation organizations. His donations grew steadily, and during his lifetime, Levy and his wife, Shelby White, gave away more than $200 million, becoming well known for their philanthropic efforts. They donated $20 million to the Metropolitan Museum of Art for the construction of the Leon Levy and Shelby White Court, a gallery hosting the largest selection of Hellenistic and Roman artwork ever exhibited at that museum. The gallery included a number of pieces from Levy and White's substantial art collection, which also includes art from the Near East. Between 1997 and 2003, Levy and White donated nearly $5 million to 107 scholars for the publication of archaeological excavations that had been completed but never published. The projects funded by their program, the Shelby White-Leon Levy Program for Archaeological Publications, include excavations at some of the highest profile archaeological sites throughout Greece and the Middle East, including Knossos, Aphrodisias, Kition, Ras Shamra, Sarepta, Mount Gerizim, Ekron, Lachish, Megiddo, Jerusalem, Pella, Jerash, the Dead Sea Scrolls, Assur, Nineveh, Nuzi, and Tepe Hissar.

They also funded the Leon Levy Expedition at Ashkelon, Israel; created the Leon Levy Visitor Center at the New York Botanical Garden; and financed the Shelby White and Leon Levy Center for Mind Brain and Behavior at Rockefeller University, where Levy was a member of the Board. Levy also served as President of the Board of the Institute for Advanced Study, Vice Chairman of the Institute of Fine Arts at New York University, and was a director of Bard College, and many other not-for-profit boards.

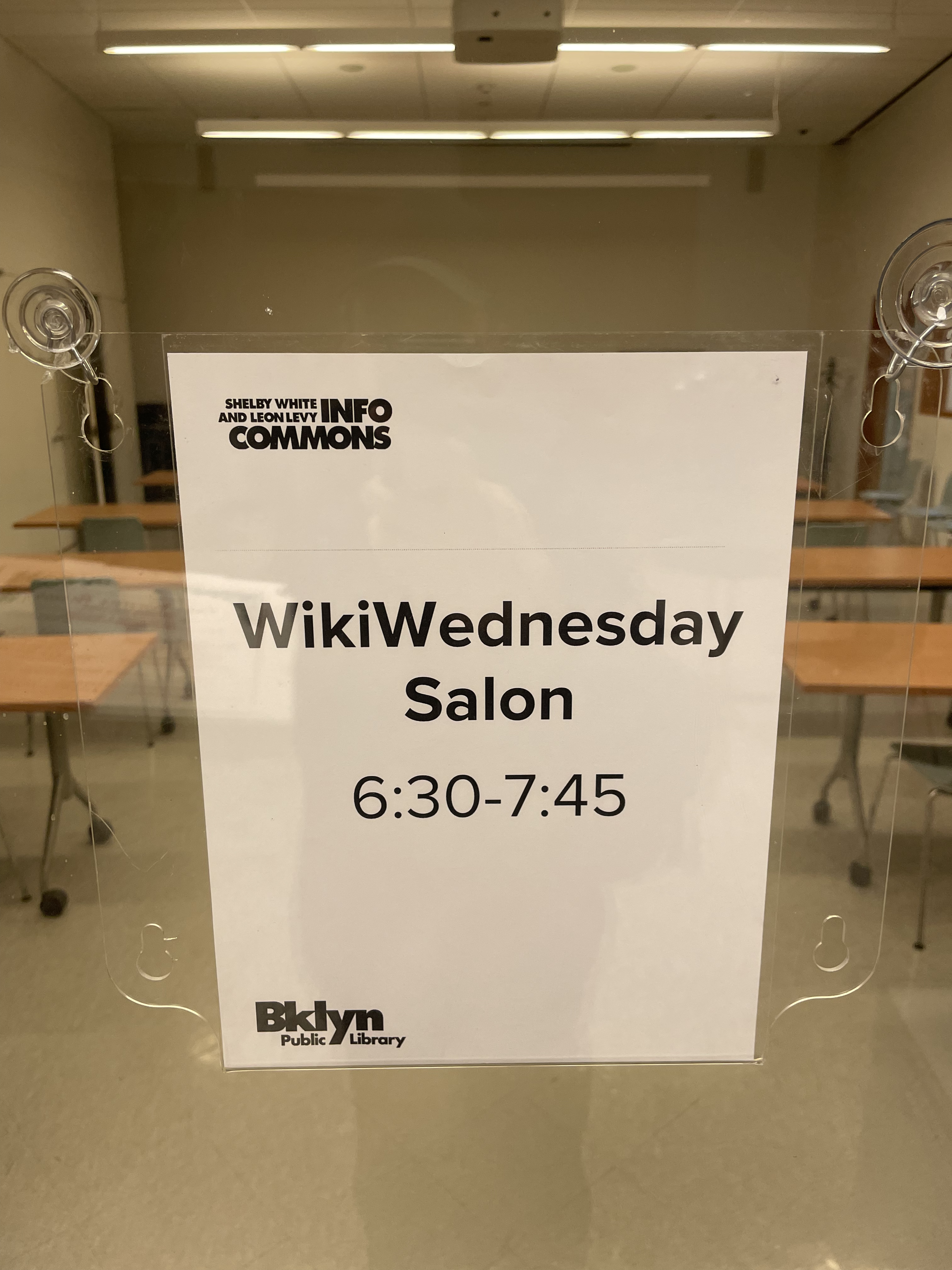
Shelby White and Leon Levy Information Commons room at the Central Library of the Brooklyn Public Library

The Leon Levy Foundation and Shelby White, as Chairman of the Friends of the Israel Antiquities Authority, provided the funds for conserving the extraordinarily well-preserved Lod Mosaic and established the Shelby White and Leon Levy Lod Mosaic Archaeological Center, which will house the mosaic once it returns from its 2010-2016 international exhibition tour. After his death in 2003, Levy's philanthropy was continued through the Leon Levy Foundation, and one of its earliest initiatives was the fulfillment of that plan. In spring, 2006, the Leon Levy Foundation pledged $200 million to New York University for the creation of the Institute for the Study of the Ancient World, a center for advanced scholarly research and graduate education, intended to cultivate cross-cultural study of the ancient world, from the western Mediterranean to China.

=== Antiquities controversy ===
The donation created controversy among some academics who believe that collectors of antiquities encourage the looting of ancient sites. In their 2006 book The Medici Conspiracy: The Illicit Journey of Looted Antiquities – From Italy's Tomb Raiders to the World's Greatest Museums, Peter Watson and Cecelia Todeschini lay out the dynamics of the illegal trade in antiquities and use Leon Levy and Shelby White as an example of collectors whose purchases may have led to unethical dealing in artifacts.

One NYU professor, Randall White, resigned from NYU's existing Center for Ancient Studies – which is independent of the new Institute for the Study of the Ancient World – saying that he opposed the acceptance of a donation from a foundation whose benefactor had sometimes been associated with such questionable practices and trafficking. Several scholars outside NYU, notably from Bryn Mawr College, the University of Pennsylvania and the University of Cincinnati, also commented negatively on NYU's acceptance of the gift. Many other scholars, however, supported the institute and the gift. Professor James McCredie, of the Institute of Fine Arts, NYU's graduate teaching and advanced research center for art history, wrote a letter to Provost David McLaughlin endorsing the project. It was signed by IFA's seven professors of ancient art and architecture, and the controversy soon died out.

== Legacy and awards ==
In 2008, he was inducted into Institutional Investors Alpha's Hedge Fund Manager Hall of Fame.

== Publications and works ==
In 2002, Levy published a memoir, written with Eugene Linden, called The Mind of Wall Street: A Legendary Financier on the Perils of Greed and the Mysteries of the Market (Perseus Book Group).

== See also ==
- List of City College of New York alumni
