= Paolo Ferri =

Italian physicist

- Born: Milan, Italy
- Occupation: Physicist

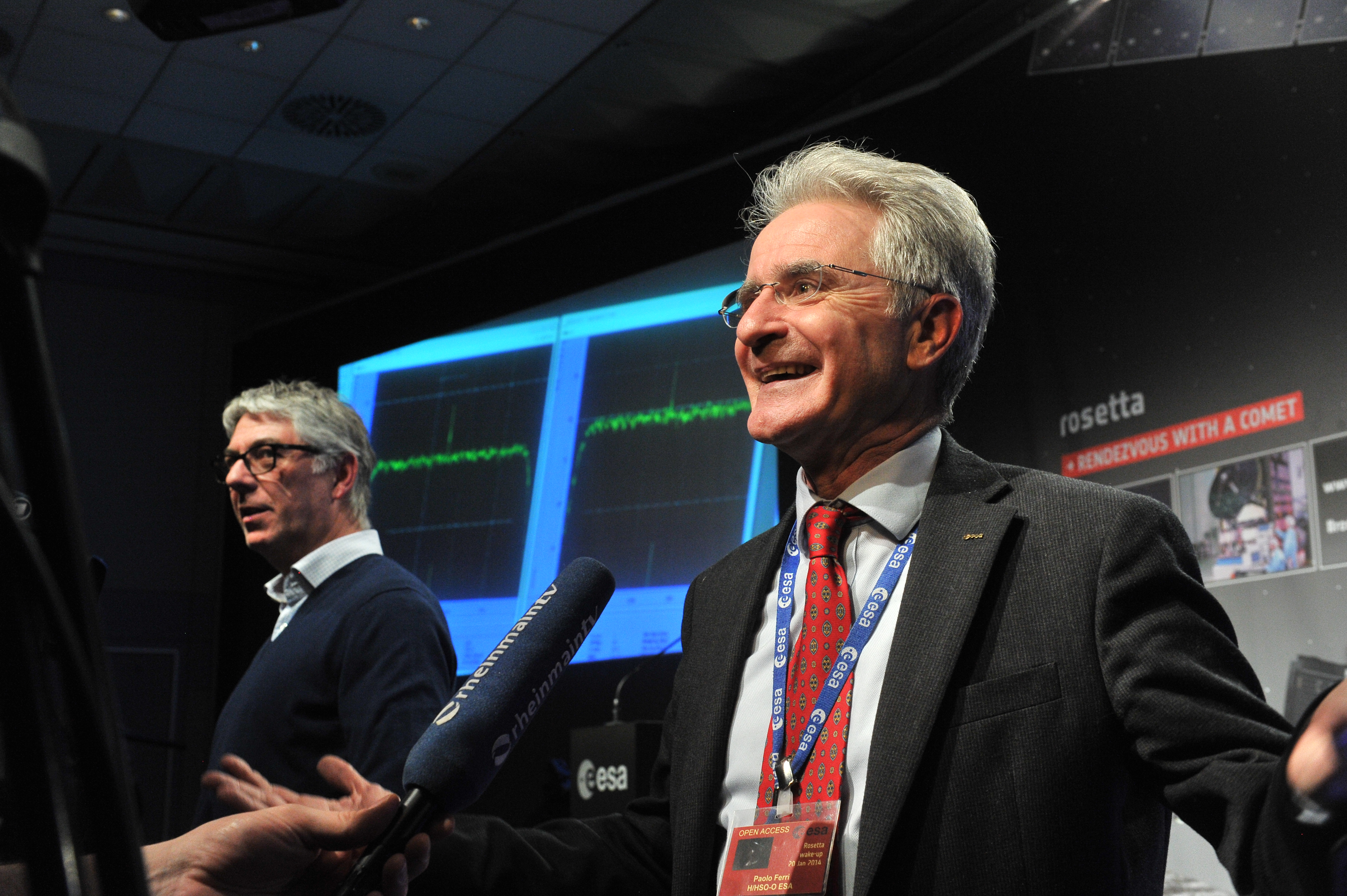
Paolo Ferri at ESOC in Darmstadt

Paolo Ferri is an Italian physicist who spent his entire career at the European Space Agency (ESA), in the field of space mission operations.

== Biography ==
Born in Milano, Italy, on 3 September 1959, Ferri received his degree in Physics in 1984 at the University of Pavia, Italy with a thesis in theoretical plasma physics applied to nuclear fusion.

In 1984, he joined ESA’s Science Directorate as a visiting scientist, working as a duty scientist at the EXOSAT Observatory, located at the European Space Operations Centre in Darmstadt, Germany.

In February 1986, Ferri moved to the field of mission operations engineering, joining ESA’s Operations Directorate. He worked as Spacecraft Operations Engineer on the EURECA microgravity mission, then as Spacecraft Operations Manager for Cluster, a 4-satellites scientific mission to study the Earth’s magnetosphere and its interaction with the solar wind and for Rosetta, the first space mission to rendezvous and land on a comet’s nucleus.

In 2006, Ferri became Head of the Solar and Planetary Mission Operations Division, in charge of the operations preparation and execution for all ESA missions in the Solar System, including Clusters, Ulysses, Rosetta, Venus Express, Mars Express, ExoMars, BepiColombo and Solar Orbiter. As part of this role he was Flight Director of Rosetta. Ferri also supported, in the role of Flight Director, the 2005 launch and 2006 arrival operations of Venus Express, and in 2009 the GOCE mission to study the Earth’s gravitational field.

In 2013, Ferri became Head of ESA’s Mission Operations Department. In that role, he was in charge of the ground segment and operations of all ESA robotic missions assigned to ESOC, and of the management of the operations of ESA’s worldwide ground stations network, ESTRACK.

Ferri retired from ESA at the end of 2020. Throughout a twenty-year tenure, Ferri's overseeing the Rosetta mission served as his primary professional focus. His involvement progressed through several key leadership roles, including operations manager, flight director, and ultimately, Head of the Mission Operations Department. Through the preparation of the Rosetta mission, he and his team built up ESA’s ground infrastructure for the control of missions in deep space.

Since July 2016, Ferri is Member of the International Academy of Astronautics, and since April 2021 Fellow of the Royal Aeronautical Society.

He authored several refereed papers in the field of space mission operations engineering, plasma physics and X-ray astrophysics.

== Awards and honors ==
In October 2015, Ferri was inducted into the Hall of Fame of the International Astronautics Federation “for his outstanding achievements in the field of spacecraft operations and flight dynamics by successfully operating numerous ESA space science missions, maximizing science return in close interaction with the investigators”.

In December 2020, Ferri was named Cavaliere of the Order of Merit of the Italian Republic for "his contribution to space sciences and the activities of the European Space Agency”.

In March 2023, Ferri received the Space Ops Lifetime Achievement Medal "for being a life-long true ambassador and a recognised authority of space mission operations and international collaboration in the domain of space missions”.

== Publications ==
=== Books ===
- Il cacciatore di comete (in Italian). Bari: Laterza. 2020. ISBN 978-88-581-4125-0.
- Il lato oscuro del sole (in Italian). Bari: Laterza. 2022. ISBN 978-88-581-4972-0.
- Le sfide di Marte: Storie di esplorazione di un pianeta difficile (in Italian). Raffaello Cortina Editore. 2023. ISBN 978-88-3285-528-9.

=== Chapters ===
- Escoubet, C. P.; Russell, C. T.; Schmidt, R., eds. (1997). "Cluster Mission Operations". The Cluster and Phoenix Missions. Kluwer Academic Publishers. pp. 475–485. doi:10.1007/978-94-011-5666-0. ISBN 978-94-010-6389-0.. Coauthored with.
- Schulz, R.; Alexander, C.; Boehnhardt, H.; Glaßmeier, K.H., eds. (2009). "Ground Segment and Mission Operations". Rosetta: ESA's Mission to the Origin of the Solar System. Springer. ISBN 978-0-387-77517-3.
- Uhlig, Thomas; Sellmaier, Florian; Schmidhuber, Michael, eds. (2015). "Interplanetary Operations". Spacecraft Operation. Springer Verlag. Bibcode:2015spop.book.....U. doi:10.1007/978-3-7091-1803-0. ISBN 978-3-7091-1802-3. Co-author of chapter 7.3 "Lander operations".
- Ley, Wilfried; Wittmann, Klaus; Hallmann, Willi, eds. (2019). "Satellitenbetrieb". Handbuch der Raumfahrttechnik (PDF) (in German) (5th ed.). Carl Hanser Verlag GmbH & Co. doi:10.3139/9783446457232. ISBN 978-3-446-45429-3. S2CID 159459209.
- Van Dick, R.; et al., eds. (2021). "Quando la pandemia raggiunse lo spazio siderale". Goethe-Vigoni Discorsi: un diario italo-tedesco (in Italian). Villa Vigoni Editore. ISBN 978-88-944986-3-9.
