= Neo Chorio, Nicosia =

Neo Chorio: Νέο Χωριό (Greek); Minareliköy (Turkish)
- Location within Cyprus
- Coordinates: 35°15′28″N 33°32′56″E
- Country (de jure): Cyprus
  - District: Nicosia District
- Country (de facto): Northern Cyprus
  - District: Lefkoşa District

Population (2011)
  - Total: 1,334
- Time zone: UTC+2 (EET)
  - Summer (DST): UTC+3 (EEST)

Neo Chorio (Greek: Νέο Χωριό (Κυθρέας); Turkish: Minareliköy) is a village in the Nicosia District of Cyprus, 2 km south of Kythrea. De facto, it is under the control of Northern Cyprus.

Until 1964, Neo Chorio had a mixed Greek- and Turkish Cypriot population with a Greek majority, when, during the Cyprus crisis of 1963–64, the Turkish Cypriot inhabitants of the village sought refuge in nearby Turkish Cypriot villages. During the 1974 Turkish invasion, the Greek Cypriots of Neo Chorio fled to the south of the island. Later, the Turkish Cypriots returned to the village. Today, it is also inhabited by many displaced Turkish Cypriots from the south, farmers from Turkey, and others.
