= Leon Levy Foundation =

Private philanthropic foundation

- Founded: 2004
- Type: 501(c)(3), exempt private foundation
- Tax ID no.: 30-6085406
- Purpose: Ancient World, Arts and Humanities, Nature and Gardens, Neuroscience Research, Human Rights, Jewish Culture
- Location: New York City, New York
- Region served: Mostly New York City
- Key people: Trustee – Shelby White, Trustee – Elizabeth B. Moynihan, Trustee – John W. Bernstein, President - Robert F. Goldrich
- Endowment: Grants
- Website: LeonLevyFoundation.org

The Leon Levy Foundation is a private philanthropic foundation based in New York City. It was created in 2004 from the estate of Leon Levy, a Wall Street investor and philanthropist.

== Purpose ==
The Leon Levy Foundation's mission is to continue Leon Levy's philanthropic legacy, encouraging and supporting development in six areas: understanding the ancient world; Arts and Humanities; preservation of nature and gardens; neuroscience research; human rights; and Jewish culture.

== Areas of interest ==
=== Ancient world ===
In 2006, the Foundation pledged $200 million to New York University for the creation of the Institute for the Study of the Ancient World (ISAW), which is housed in a building located at 15 East 84th Street, New York, NY 10028. ISAW is a PhD graduate program and a center for post-doctoral researchers. ISAW focuses on the study of the economic, religious, political and cultural connections between and among ancient civilizations around the Mediterranean basin, and across central Asia to the Pacific Ocean. Its approach is multi-disciplinary, concerning anthropology, archaeology, geography, geology, history, economics, sociology, art history, and the history of science and technology.

Roger Bagnall, a classics professor and former Graduate School dean at Columbia University, became the first director in 2007. ISAW has nine full-time faculty members. Since its founding, ISAW has given fellowships to more than 50 Visiting Research Scholars. ISAW also organizes scholarly exhibitions, which are open to the public free of charge and are visual manifestations of its scholarly programs. They have included Wine, Worship, and Sacrifice: The Golden Graves of Ancient Vani; The Lost World of Old Europe: The Danube Valley, 5000 – 3500 BC; Before Pythagoras: The Culture of Old Babylonian Mathematics; Nubia: Ancient Kingdoms of Africa; and Edge of Empires: Pagans, Jews, and Christians at Roman Dura-Europos. ISAW also has a lecture program which is open to the public, and sponsors online archeological publications.

Other large Leon Levy Foundation grants in ancient world studies include the establishment of the Philip J. King Professorship at Harvard University to endow a chair with an interdisciplinary approach to studying the civilizations of the ancient world; continued funding of the excavation of the Leon Levy Expedition to the seaport of Ashkelon, one of the five ancient Philistine cities in Israel; and the Shelby White – Leon Levy Program for Archaeological Publications, which supports the publication of research on terminated and unpublished archaeological field work from significant sites in the Aegean, Anatolia, Balkans, Iranian Plateau, Levant, Mesopotamia and China.

=== Arts and Humanities ===
The Foundation has awarded nearly $15 million to more than 30 cultural institutions to catalogue and make available to the public archival documents. The Foundation awarded the New York Philharmonic a grant to digitize and manage 1.3 million pages of archives. "Paid for by a $2.4 million grant from the Leon Levy Foundation, the release contains 3,200 programs; hundreds of documents; more than 1,000 scores marked by past conductors, including Mahler; letters; handwritten notes; old clippings; and yellowing Western Union telegrams." In 2008, the Foundation created the Leon Levy Center for Biography at the Graduate Center of CUNY. In 2009, the Foundation provided $2.25 million to the Brooklyn Public Library. The Wall Street Journal reported, "The gift, which comes at a time when the library faces a $20.6 million cut in city funding and is the largest donation, will create the Leon Levy Information Commons, a technology-based learning and research hub at its Central Library."

=== Nature and gardens ===
The Foundation has awarded $15 million for the creation of a Native Plant Garden at the New York Botanical Garden. Other gifts include $10 million to Prospect Park in Brooklyn for restoration of lakeside area to the original 1866 design of Frederick Law Olmsted and Calvert Vaux, and $7.5 million to the Brooklyn Botanical Garden for a water conservation initiative, the largest private "greening" gifts in New York City history." The Foundation also supports bird conservation organizations including the Cornell Lab of Ornithology and the American Bird Conservancy aimed at preventing bird mortality caused by collisions with windows, communications towers, wind-energy turbines and other obstacles. Working with the Bahamas National Trust, the Foundation has also established the Leon Levy Native Plant Preserve on the island of Eleuthera, Bahamas to preserve the medicinal plants and flora of the island.

=== Neuroscience research ===
The Foundation underwrites fundamental research about the functioning of the human brain, with an emphasis on understanding the basis of behavior. Fellowship programs have been established at five research institutions in New York City." In 2008, the Foundation awarded a $4.5 million grant to Rockefeller University to fund the Leon Levy Presidential Fellowships in Neuroscience. The first Leon Levy Neuroscience Fellows Symposium was held at Rockefeller University on May 16, 2012."

=== Human rights ===
The Foundation supports organizations that advance and protect the right to political freedom, blind justice, humane treatment, free speech and international legal standards, including The Committee to Protect Journalists, the American Civil Liberties Union, and Freedom House. "In 2011, the Foundation awarded Human Rights First a grant for a two-year fellowship and a pilot project to increase high quality pro bono legal representation of indigent asylum-seekers and other immigrants in New York City."

=== Jewish culture ===
The Foundation supports the Center for Jewish History and the Yeshiva University Museum as well as the Lower East Side Tenement Museum, where the building at 103 Orchard Street has been named, the Sadie Samuelson Levy Immigrant Heritage Center, in honor of Leon Levy's mother.

== Leadership ==
The Foundation, created from Leon Levy's estate in 2004, named his widow, Shelby White, and their friend, Elizabeth B. Moynihan, as Trustees. Assets of the Foundation, at inception, totaled approximately $500 million. John W. Bernstein was appointed the first president of the Foundation in 2004. In 2015, Mr. Bernstein was named as a Trustee, and Robert F. Goldrich, former senior advisor in the Bloomberg Administration, was named president.
