= Robin Symes =

British disgraced antiquities dealer (1939–2023)

- Born: February 1939
- Died: 30 October 2023 (aged 84)
- Citizenship: British
- Partner: Christo Michaelides (died 1999)

Robin Symes (February 1939 – 30 October 2023) was a British antiquities dealer who was unmasked as a key player in an international criminal network that traded in looted archaeological treasures. Symes and his long-term partner Christo Michaelides met and formed a business partnership in the 1970s, and Symes became one of Britain's most prominent and successful antiquities dealers. However, after Michaelides died accidentally in 1999, his family took legal action to recover his share of the Symes company's assets, and when the matter went to trial, Symes was found to have lied in his evidence about the extent and value of his property; he was subsequently charged with and convicted of contempt of court, and sentenced to two years' imprisonment, of which he served seven months. Further investigations by Italian authorities revealed in January 2016 that Symes's involvement in the illegal antiquities trade had been even more extensive than previously thought, and that he had hidden a vast hoard of looted antiquities in 45 crates at the Geneva Freeport storage warehouse in Switzerland for 15 years to conceal them from Michaelides's family.

== Career ==
Called "London’s best-known and most successful dealer in antiquities", Symes was also accused of playing a pivotal role in the illegal trade of looted antiquities, which is detailed in Peter Watson and Cecilia Todeschini's 2006 book The Medici Conspiracy: The Illicit Journey of Looted Antiquities from Italy's Tomb Raiders to the World's Greatest Museums. According to the accusations brought against Symes, he was the main dealer in Giacomo Medici's operation, selling looted antiquities from Robert E. Hecht and Medici to many renowned Western museums. One of the main museums involved was the J. Paul Getty Museum, whose curator, Marion True, was later indicted for illegal trafficking of antiquities. She had been a student of Dietrich von Bothmer, curator of the Metropolitan Museum in New York. The Metropolitan acquired the Euphronios Krater, which was returned to Italy in February 2006.

== Downfall ==
Symes's downfall was the result of a conflict with the family of his late partner Christo Michaelides, son and heir to the Papadimitriou shipping family. After Michaelides died from injuries sustained in an accidental fall while on holiday in 1999, a conflict arose over the assets of the partnership. Incensed by Symes's dismissive attitude, his refusal to return valuable personal effects, his repeated denials (later proven to be false) that the Papadimitriou family had any involvement in the partnership, and his assertion that all Christo's assets were his by right of inheritance, the Papadimitriou family determined to pursue the matter at any cost.

Christo's nephew Dimitri Papadimitriou coordinated a massive effort to bring Symes to justice, spending a reported US$16 million on private investigators and legal fees in order to prove his legal claim to half of the Robin Symes Limited assets, a legal case Papadimitriou eventually won and which pushed Symes into bankruptcy, resulting in his conviction on 21 January 2005. Symes was found guilty of contempt after it was determined that he had deliberately lied to the court in order to conceal the extent and value of his collection, estimated to be worth at least £125 million. Symes was also found to have systematically under-reported the size of the payments he received from wealthy clients; he testified in court that he had sold an Egyptian statue of the Greek god Apollo to an Arab sheikh for £1.1 million although the sheikh had paid Symes £3.1 million. Another Egyptian statue was sold for £5.5 million, but reported as £2.5 million, and Symes also claimed to have sold some art deco furniture for £2.8 million rather than the real figure of £9.7 million. Symes claimed to have assets stored in only four facilities, but investigations proved that he had secreted his vast collection across some 29 storage facilities in London, New York and Switzerland, and much of this material is now thought to have been looted from archaeological sites in Italy and other locations by gangs of tombaroli (tomb robbers) affiliated with the now-notorious Italian 'art dealer' Giacomo Medici. The gangs of tombaroli looted tombs and other archaeological sites, and stole other valuable antiquities from poorly-guarded museums and private collections. These were sold to Medici and his fellow dealers, who then created false "paper trails" by arranging for the looted objects to be cleaned and restored. Medici and his associates then 'laundered' the objects through established dealers, including Symes and Robert E. Hecht, who then sold the artefacts on, at a vast profit, to major museums and wealthy private collectors.

In January 2016, officers from the art crimes squad of the Italian carabinieri, working in collaboration with Swiss authorities, raided a storage unit that Symes rented at the Geneva Freeport in Switzerland. It was found to contain a vast haul of stolen antiquities, nearly all of which are believed to have been looted by the Medici gang from Etruscan- and Roman-era archaeological sites in Italy and other locations over a period of at least forty years. Packed inside 45 crates, investigators discovered some 17,000 Greek, Roman and Etruscan artefacts, including two stunning Etruscan terracotta sarcophagi topped by painted life-sized reclining figures, hundreds of whole or fragmentary pieces of rare Greek and Roman pottery, statuary and bas-reliefs, fragments of a fresco from Pompeii, and an ivory head of Apollo dating from the 1st century BCE, which is thought to have been looted from the Baths of Claudius, near Rome. The trove is estimated to be worth hundreds of millions of pounds, with the head of Apollo alone valued at £30 million (approximately US$44 million). Symes is alleged to have hidden the objects at the Freeport warehouse soon after Michaelides's death to conceal them from the executors of Michaelides's estate and keep their huge value out of any settlement.
