= Archaeological looting =

Theft of artifacts from archaeological sites

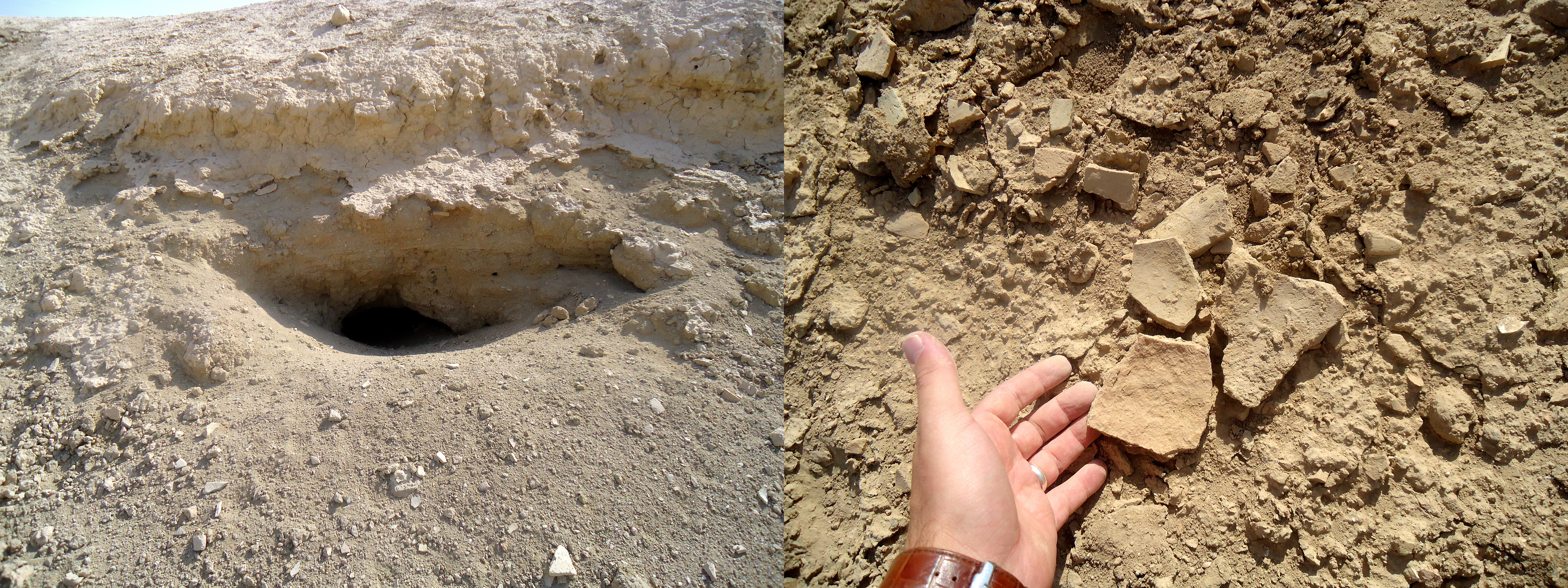
A looter's pit (left) at the ancient Sumerian city of Kish, Iraq. Fragments of pottery (right) are scattered near the pit

Archaeological looting is the illicit removal of artifacts from an archaeological site. Such looting is the major source of artifacts for the antiquities market. Looting typically involves either the illegal exportation of artifacts from their country of origin or the domestic distribution of looted goods. Looting has been linked to the economic and political stability of the possessing nation, with levels of looting increasing during times of crisis. Although it has been known to occur during peacetimes and some looters take part in the practice as a means of income, referred to as subsistence looting. However, looting is also local in so-called "archaeological countries" like Italy, Greece, Turkey, Cyprus and other areas of the Mediterranean Basin, as well as many areas of Africa, South East Asia and Central and South America, which have a rich heritage of archaeological sites. A large proportion of these sites are still unknown to formal archaeological science. Many countries have antique looting laws which state that the removal of the cultural object without formal permission is illegal and considered theft. Looting is not only illegal; the practice may also threaten access to cultural heritage.

Grave robbery can constitute a type of archaeological looting. Often, grave robbing involves stealing artifacts or personal items from the burial which may later be sold on the black market.

== Causes ==
According to the archaeologist Ricardo J. Elia "The primary cause of looting is collecting. Collectors, both private and institutional (i.e., museums), acquire archaeological objects for their artistic, aesthetic, and investment values."

== Sites of archaeological looting ==
=== Egypt ===
Much of Egypt's cultural heritage has been and remains under threat of pillage. Tomb raiders and looters have been attempting to steal from Pharaonic sites since such structures were built, and the 2011 Arab Spring revolution has only since exacerbated the problem. Three regions have been especially hit hard since the revolution, with some estimates citing a five hundred percent increase in looting in the sites of Saqqara, Lisht, and el Hibeh. Many sites are often left unguarded and unmonitored due to a lack of funding, but there has been a recent surge in social media activism that seeks to report and document the loss and damage caused by looters, in an attempt to combat further theft and vandalism.

=== Syria ===
==== Apamea ====
Apamea was a Greco-Roman city with a large acropolis in the western region of modern-day Syria, located on the bank of the Orontes river. It is an important archaeological site, with several notable remains such as the Great Colonnade and a sizable Roman theater. In the chaos created by the Syrian civil war, the site has been looted and damaged extensively, as evidenced by satellite imagery of the area.

==== Dura-Europos ====
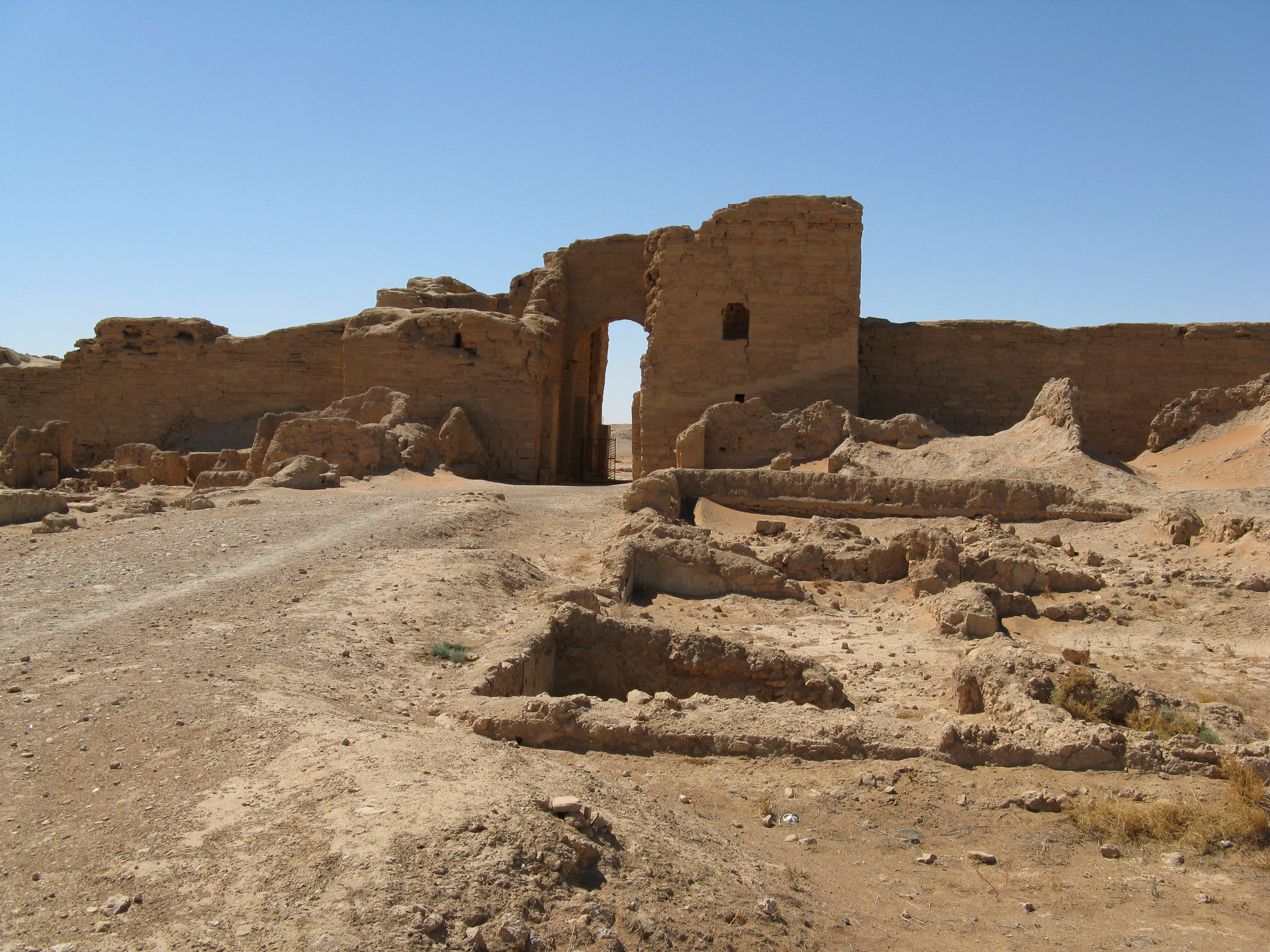
Ruins of Dura-Europos

Dura-Europos is an ancient city located in modern-day southeast Syria covering about 140 acres of land. It was built from stone in 256 CE in an early Roman era town. In 1920, it was discovered by British soldiers while digging trenches during World War I. Multiple figures, shrines, and sculptures of various cultures and religions (Roman, Sumerian, Palmyrene, Judean, Parthian, and Greek) were found here. It also contains sacred architecture, wall paintings, and the oldest depiction of Jesus Christ. The site represents a blend of many different cultural traditions. It is said that 70 percent of the site has been ruined because of looters. Based on images from satellites in 2014, the mud-brick walls have been left cratered.

=== Ventarron, Peru ===
Ventarron is an archaeological site in the Lambayeque region in Northern Peru. It is the location of a temple built roughly around 2000 BCE, making it one of the oldest archaeological sites in South America. The site has been looted repeatedly, mostly due to low surveillance and resources to protect the site. A study by Lasapornara et al. uses satellite imagery to investigate the extension of the looting.

== Controversial artifacts ==
=== Elgin Marbles ===
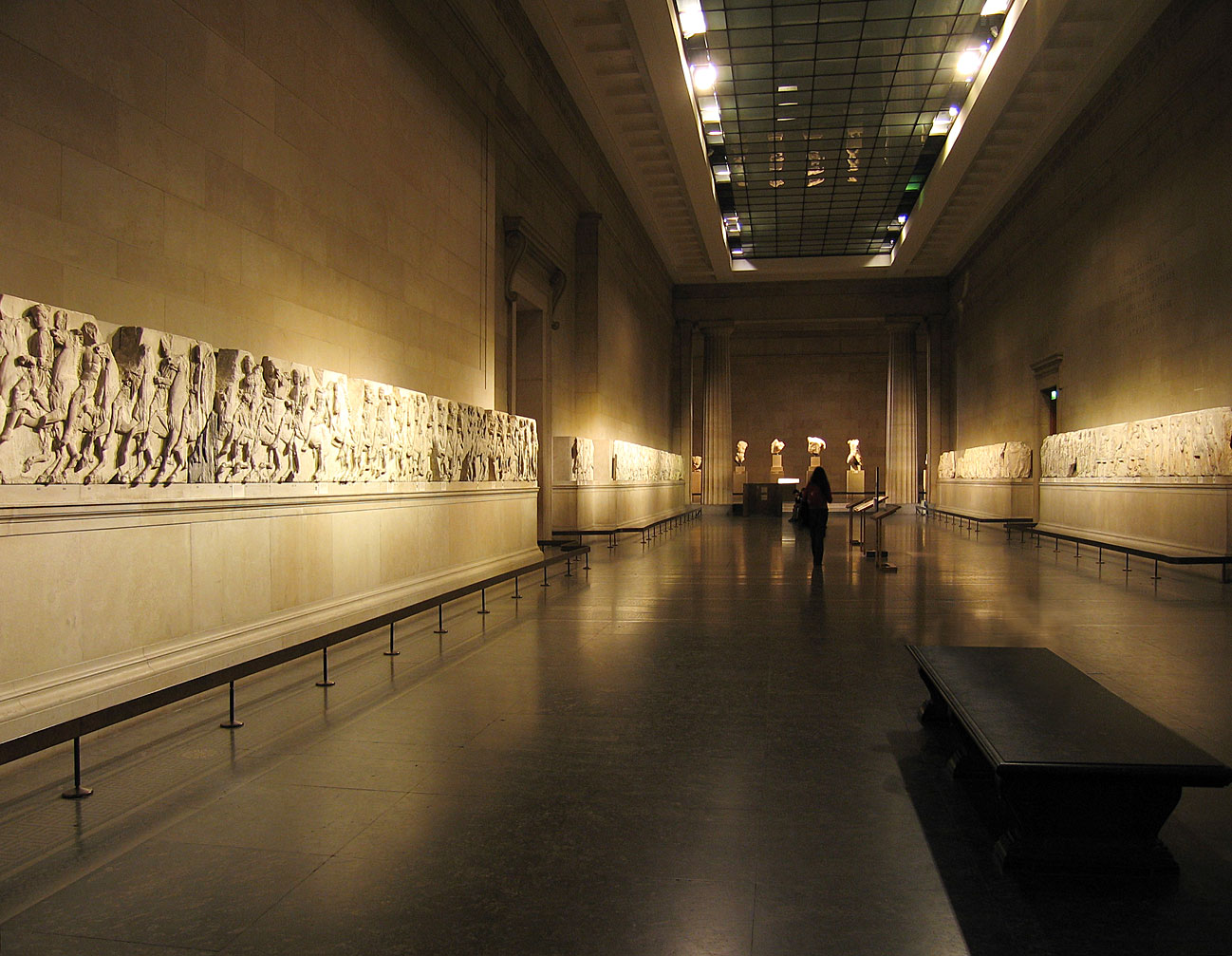
The Elgin Marbles residing in the British Museum

The Elgin Marbles, or Parthenon Marbles are a collection of architecture and sculptures originating from the Parthenon in Athens. Thomas Bruce of Scotland, the 7th Earl of Elgin removed the Marbles and had them shipped to England. Thomas Bruce was the Ottoman Empire's British ambassador. Some say that the 7th Earl of Elgin looted the Marbles, but others say that he received permission from the Ottoman authorities. The Elgin Marbles were removed from Greece and brought to London. The Marbles were bought from the 7th Earl of Elgin by Great Britain and they are now displayed in the British Museum. It is a controversial topic as to who the Elgin Marbles belong to. The Greek government wants the Marbles back because at the time the Marbles were taken to London, Greece was under the control of the Ottoman Empire. The British Museum wants to keep the marbles in London because they claim they are saving the Marbles from damage despite the Acropolis Museum in Athens having been built specifically with the protection of these artifacts in mind.

=== Euphronios Krater ===
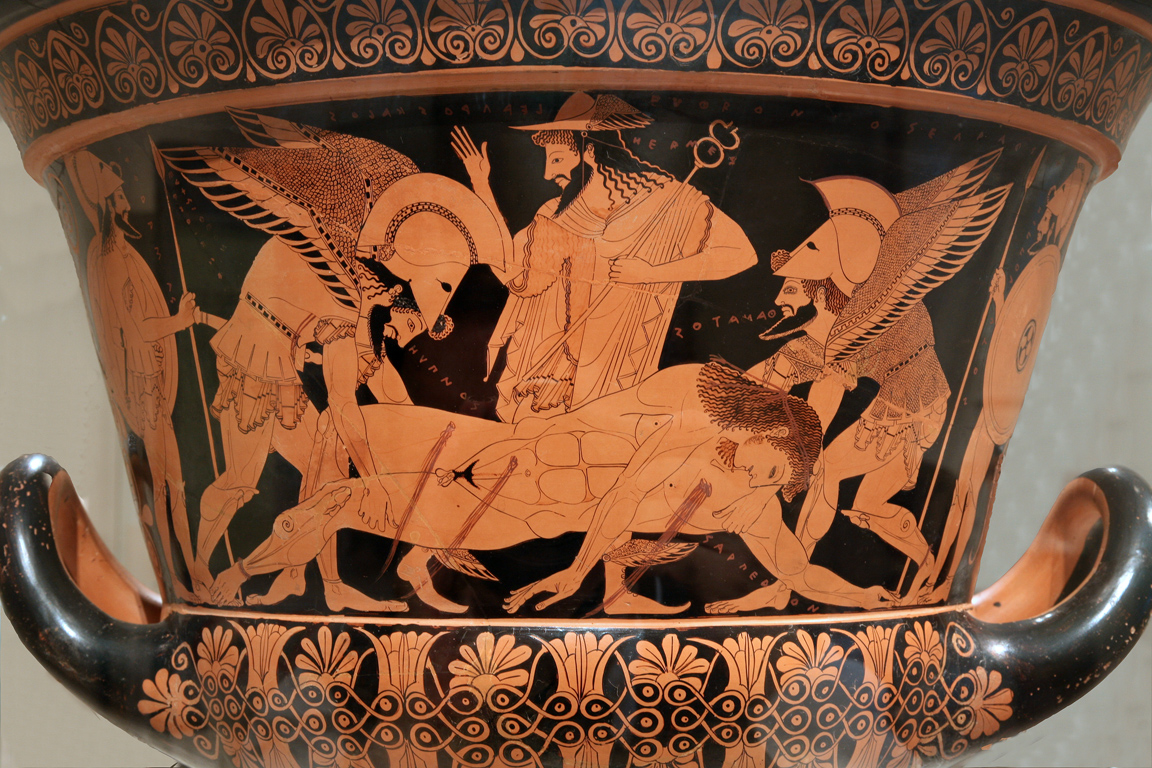
The Euphronios Krater painting of Sarpedon dying

The Euphronios, or Sarpedon Krater, is an ancient Greek vessel. It was made around 515 BC in Athens by the artist Euphronios. The vessel was used to mix wine and water. The vessel is said to have been excavated from an Etruscan tomb. The painting on it is an image of Sarpedon, the son of Zeus, dying with Hermes, Hypnos, and Thanatos surrounding Sarpedon. The vessel also includes a painting of three children of Athens preparing for a battle. One popular story for the Euphronios Krater is that the Krater was looted by grave robbers and then sold to Giacomo Medici, an Italian art dealer who was convicted of receiving and exporting stolen objects. The Krater is said to have then been sold to antiques dealer Robert Hecht and then sold to the Metropolitan Museum of Art. That museum is said to have purchased the Euphronios Krater in 1972 for one million dollars. Eventually, the Krater was returned to the Italian government and the Krater was brought to the Villa Giulia Museum in Rome.

== Detecting looted sites by satellite ==
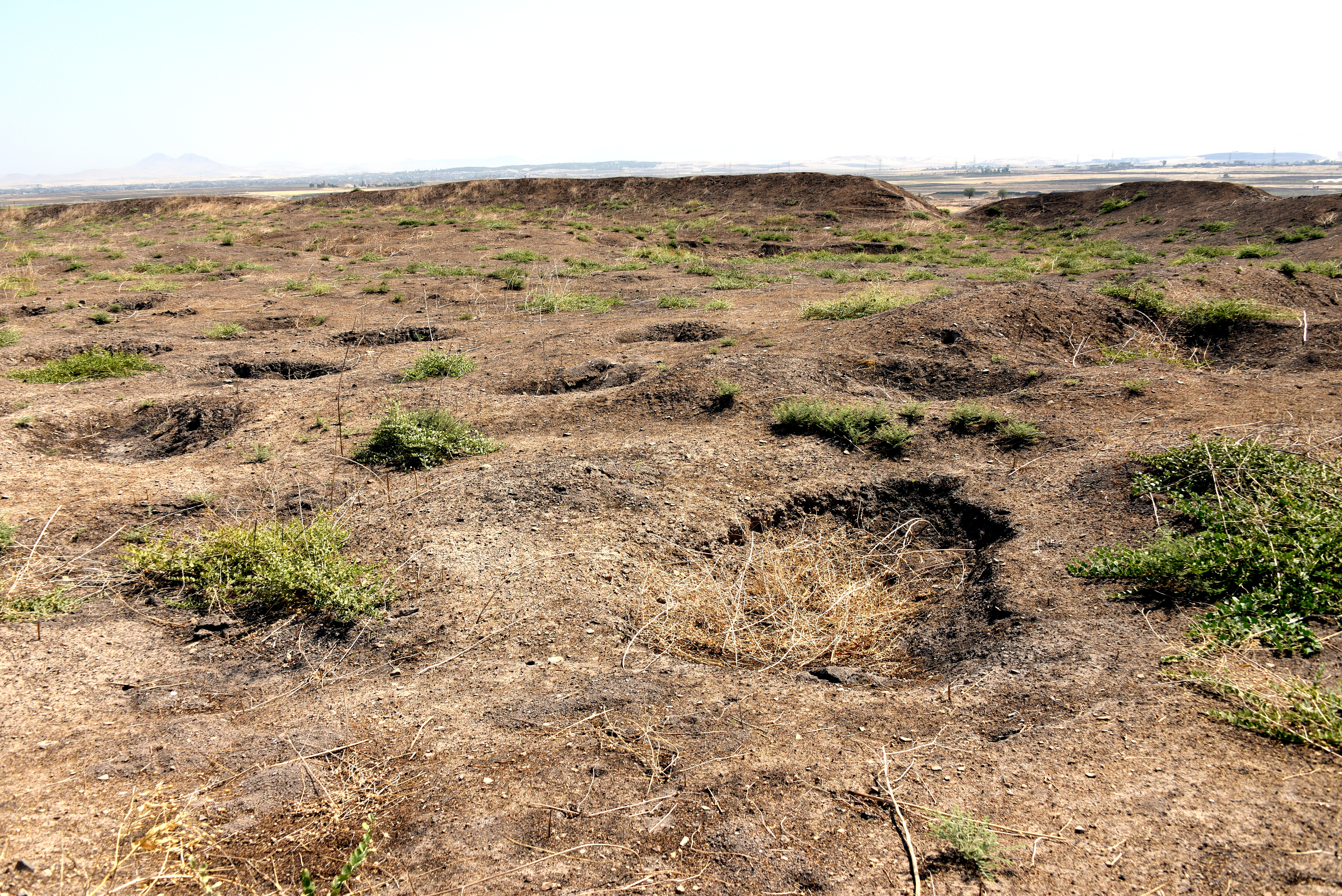
The telltale "pockmarks" at a looted site which algorithms can recognize and flag as suspicious

Illegal excavations leave distinctive pits across the surface of an archaeological site which bear no resemblance to the surface changes made by official, methodological archaeological work. Satellite imaging is one method employed to help identify sites of looting, both by detecting recent lootings and by corroborating reports from locals on the ground, and recent technological advancements have enabled the use of software which automatically parses through satellite images applied to digital elevation models (DEMs) to find irregularities consistent with sites of looting. Satellites have also been used effectively to keep an eye on sites where looting has been known to occur. Additional measures of aerial surveillance of archaeological sites, including by drones, helicopters, and airplanes, have seen limited application due to interference imposed by local governments and conflict. Satellite imaging may be effective at detecting locations which have been looted in this visually distinct way, but these techniques are ineffective when applied to other ways in which historic sites can be stolen from or defaced.

== Countermeasures ==
In at least one instance, looters who carved up the head of a lamassu in 1995, under Saddam Hussein, in order to smuggle it out of Iraq, were caught and executed.

== See also ==
- Archaeological looting in Iraq
- Archaeological looting in Romania
- Hobby Lobby smuggling scandal
- Art theft
- UNESCO
- Indiana Jones

== Sources ==
- Bowman Proulx, Blythe (January 2013) "Archaeological Site Looting in "Glocal" Perspective: Nature, Scope, and Frequency". American Journal of Archaeology (Archaeological Institute of America) 117 (1): 111-125 JSTOR 10.3764/aja.117.1.0111 doi:10.3764/aja.117.1.0111 (subscription required)
- Elia, Ricardo J. (1997). "Looting, collecting, and the destruction of archaeological resources". Nonrenewable Resources. 6 (2): 85–98. doi:10.1007/BF02803807.
- Valdés, Juan Antonio (2006). "Management and Conservation of Guatemala's Cultural Heritage: A Challenge to Keep History Alive". In Barbara T. Hoffman (ed.). Art and cultural heritage: law, policy, and practice. New York, USA: Cambridge University Press. pp. 94–99. ISBN 978-0-521-85764-2. OCLC 434442795.
