= Pietro Casasanta =

Italian antiquities looter (1937/38 to 2018)

Pietro Casasanta (born c. 1937 – c. 1938, died c. 2018) was an Italian antiquities looter. Known as the "prince of the tombaroli [looters]", he was one of Italy's most prolific illegal excavators. Over the course of his fifty-year career, during which he was incarcerated several times, Casasanta discovered and sold hundreds of artifacts. These include the Capitoline Triad of Guidonia and the fragmentary chryselephantine mask of Apollo.

== Early life and involvement in antiques ==
Pietro Casasanta was born in Anguillara Sabazia, a small town north of Rome. His grandfather was an illiterate shepherd, and his father was a mason; both were small-time looters who taught Casasanta tricks of the trade. He never graduated from high school. Casasanta began collecting small artifacts, such as potsherds, in his teens, while he was training to become a land surveyor. After he began selling these artifacts to local antiquities dealers, he taught himself archaeology through secondhand books, particularly texts by Rodolfo Lanciani. He began excavating in earnest in 1960.

== Looting activities ==
Casasanta developed strategies to discover and excavate ancient sites over his years of practice as a tombarolo. He was skilled in identifying possible ruined buildings from on-the-ground brush growth patterns, and occasionally borrowed a glider to survey prospective sites from above. He did most of his excavations in the Roman hinterland, and specialized in ruined villas. Casasanta, who eventually worked with a team including his son, usually impersonated a construction worker in order to work in daylight (between 6 AM and 5 PM) frequently using a Caterpillar bulldozer to move soil. While Casasanta was able to work with relative impunity for years, his team occasionally paid off locals to keep excavations secret. Casasanta took pride in his profession and the villas he discovered, and the fact that he was not a "grave robber". However, Casasanta frequently left his dig sites littered with destroyed remnants and irreparably damaged much of what he excavated.

Casasanta made attempts to cut out middlemen in the looted antiquity trade, frequently traveling to Basel in order to "make a name for himself" and pick up Gianfranco Becchina's clients. However, despite his relative prominence among tombaroli, he was unable to establish himself as a dealer. Despite his illegal and destructive methods, Casasanta carefully logged his discoveries and kept diaries, most of which were seized by police.

=== Notable discoveries ===
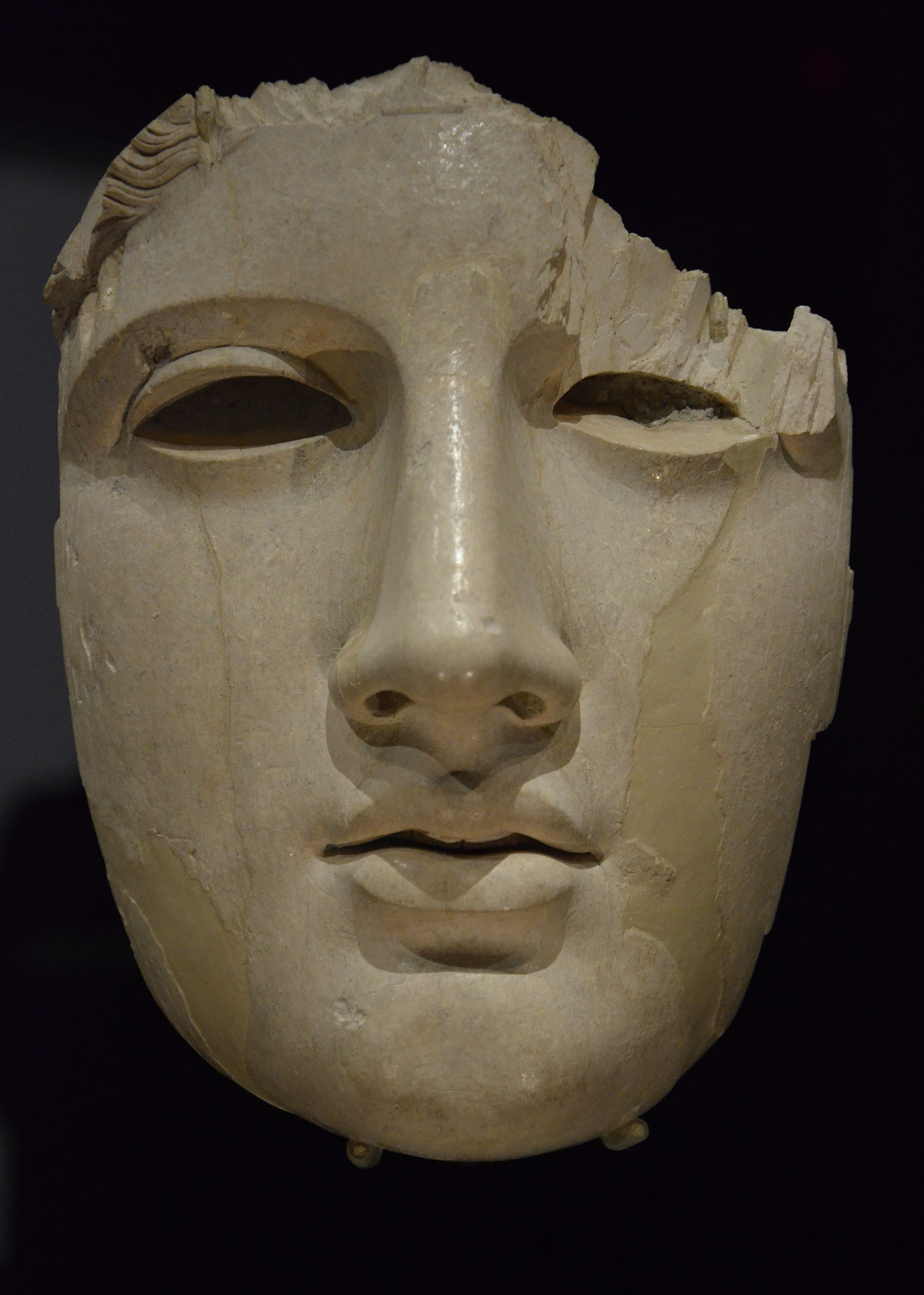
The ivory Mask of Apollo (c. 5th–1st century BCE)

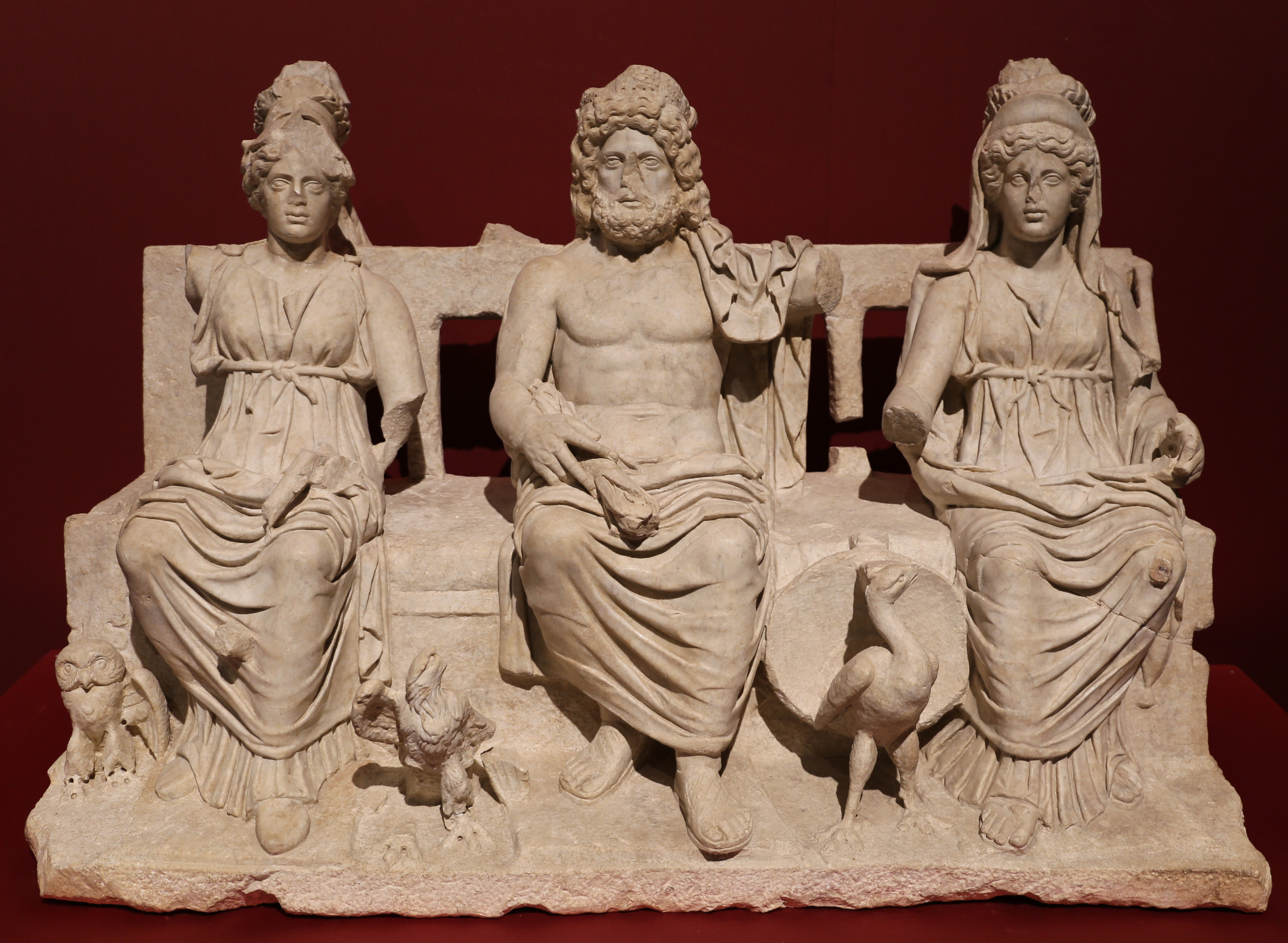
The Capitoline Triad of Guidonia (c. 160–180 CE)

Casasanta excavated hundreds of artifacts from sites in the vicinity of Rome. In 1970, he discovered a settlement and cult site at L'Inviolata (near Guidonia), from which he recovered 63 statues, 25 of them life-size. Casasanta stated that he sold many of the statues to Robin Symes.

In 1992, he discovered the only complete marble Capitoline Triad at L'Inviolata. The statue is thought to be an smaller-scale reproduction of the Triad held in the Temple of Jupiter Optimus Maximus. He and two associates, Moreno De Angelis and Carlo Alberto Chiozzi, discovered the six-ton statue while digging near a Roman villa or temple wall. Casasanta initially attempted to sell the Triad to Edoardo Almagià, a prolific dealer charged with several crimes in 2023, and eventually sold it to a dealer in Lugano, who in turn sold it to a buyer in Switzerland. De Angelis was unhappy with his cut of the sale's profits, and reported Casasanta to the Carabinieri. He was arrested and sent to prison later in 1992. The Triad, unsellable, was abandoned by Casasanta's traffickers and recovered in a warehouse on the Swiss border in 1993. It currently is held at Rodolfo Lanciani Civic Archaeological Museum in Guidonia.

Less than a year after his release from prison, in 1994, he discovered an ivory mask of Apollo and other fragments of a chryselephantine statue, thought by some scholars be the work of Phidias (more conservative estimates date it to the 1st c. BCE), near the Baths of Claudius by Aguillara. Casasanta claims that he found the mask in a cistern, along with several acroliths, in the ruins of a villa. He sold the artifact to an Italian dealer based in Munich, Antonio Savoca. In October 1994, a joint operation of the Italian Judicial Police and Munich Police raided the Savoca house, but the police was unaware of the discovery of the mask, which had been sold on at that point. After rumors and a photograph of the artifact surface, Casasanta, who had not been paid the agreed-upon price by Savoca, confessed to discovering and selling it in 1998. Alternatively, Casasanta claims that he tipped off the Carabinieri soon after its discovery and initiated the raid against Savoca. In any case, the mask found its way to Robin Symes, who returned it to Italy in 2003; by then, it was unsellable and Symes was under prosecution in Italy. The mask currently resides in the National Roman Museum of Palazzo Massimo.

== Convictions and later life ==
The Italian authorities cracked down on looting in the 1990s, when Casasanta spent a year in prison following the discovery of the Capitoline Triad. The uncovering of the Giacomo Medici artifact-trafficking ring in 1995 resulted in an abrupt end to Italy's most profitable antiquities-trafficking scheme. Casasanta had long worked with Medici to secure the export of artifacts he discovered out of Italy.

He was a witness at the 2007 Italian trial of Marion True and Robert E. Hecht. Casasanta did not personally deal with the accused, but provided information regarding the diffusion and sale of looted Italian artifacts. At the trial, Casasanta defended his work, saying that he was "saving" artifacts that otherwise would have been lost to development and remarking that he was a "hero" who should be made "a senator for life". He also testified that many of the artifacts he excavated passed through the hands of Robin Symes and Phoenix Ancient Art's Aboutaam brothers, and that the latter organization gave him a tour of its warehouse.

While Casasanta made millions of dollars from his operation, he lost much of his fortune to gambling, police seizures, and legal fees. He stated that he had cumulatively spent nine years in jail and more on probation. Casasanta retired to Aguillara with his wife, where he lived at the time of his death. He was known for his rustic personality and chainsmoking. Casasanta was proud of his work, and considered himself a "dilettante" archaeologist. He had sympathies with the neofascist Italian Social Movement. He died around 2018.
