= Carabinieri Art Squad =

Italian police unit for art crimes

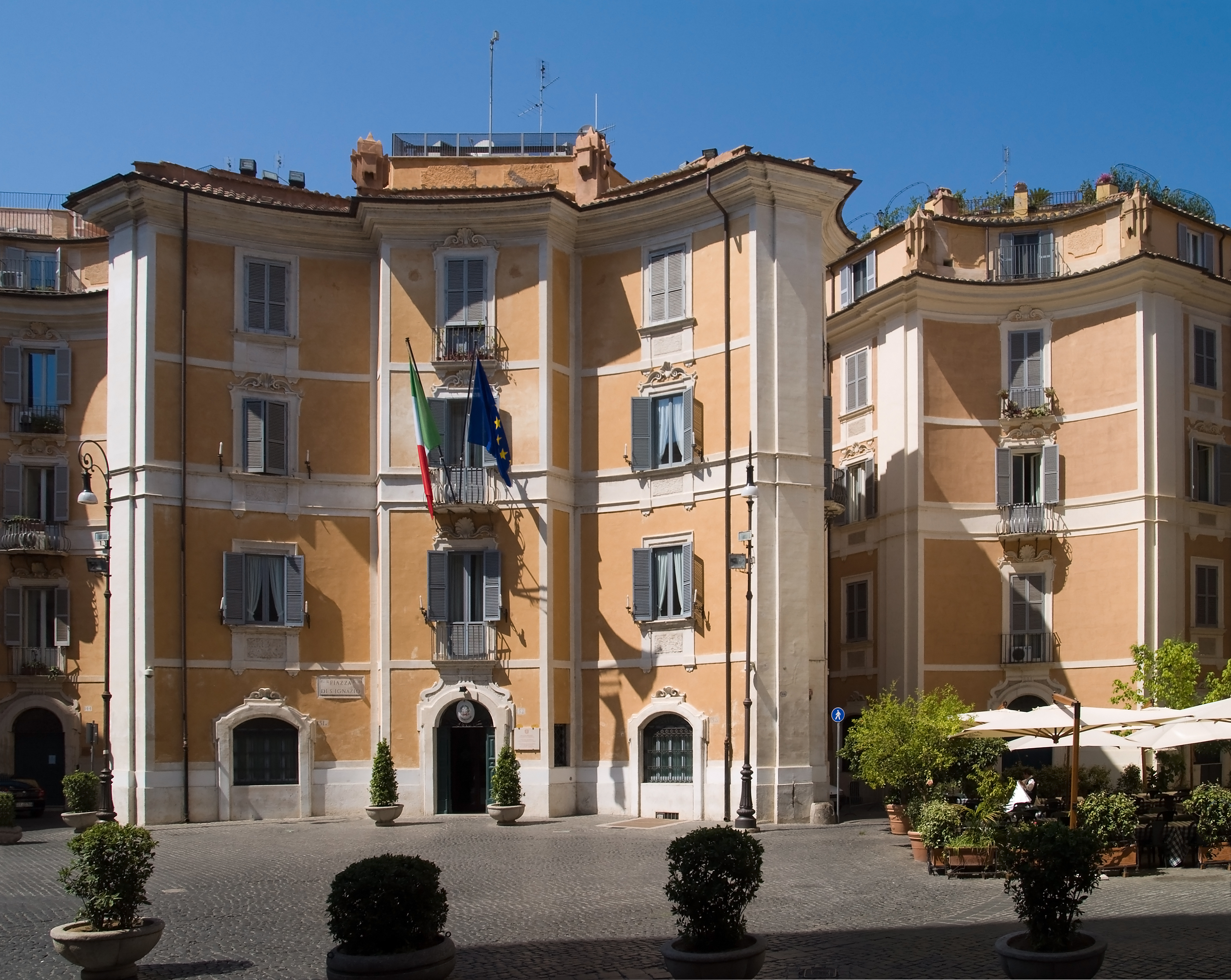
Palazzo Sant'Ignazio in Rome, headquarters of the Carabinieri Art Squad

The Carabinieri Command for the Protection of Cultural Heritage, better known as the Carabinieri T.P.C., is the branch of the Italian Carabinieri responsible for combatting art and antiquities crimes and is viewed as an experienced and efficient task force.

== History ==
Il Nucleo Tutela Patrimonio Artistico was founded by General Arnaldo Ferrara on 3 May 1969. It was the first specialist police force in the world in this sector, predating the UNESCO Convention on the Means of Prohibiting and Preventing the Illicit Import, Export and Transfer of Ownership of Cultural Property of 1970. On 5 March 1992 the force was renamed Comando Carabinieri per la Tutela del Patrimonio Culturale.

== Organization ==
The force has four sections: archaeology, antique dealing, fakes, and contemporary art. It is led by a colonel and headquartered in Rome, with twelve regional offices. It functions in coordination with the Ministero per i Beni e le Attività Culturali.

== Activities ==
The force investigates clandestine excavations, the theft and illicit trade in works of art, damage to monuments and archaeological zones, the illegal export of cultural property, and fakes. It is involved in the monitoring and control of archaeological sites, and the activities of art and antique dealers, junk shops, and restorers. The force is also involved in forensic analysis; the development and promotion of educational materials; advising overseas ministries, police forces and customs bodies; international peacekeeping missions; and the protection and recovery of cultural property in disaster zones.

== Partners ==
The force works internationally with organisations including UNESCO, UNIDROIT, ICOMOS, ICOM, and INTERPOL. Domestically it works in partnership with a number of universities, cultural foundations, and research centres, including ICCROM, as well as the local soprintendenze and ecclesiastical bodies.

== Publications and media ==
The force maintains a database of stolen works. As of 1 March 2011, some 5,290 missing items were listed as having particular economic or cultural value. It also publishes a Bulletin of Trafficked Art Works, 2010 seeing the 32nd annual issue.

== Results ==
In 2009, some 39,584 looted antiquities and 19,043 other works were recovered, valued at €165 million. In 2008, works valued at €183 million were recovered. Improved international collaboration, site security, and databases saw a drop of 14.5% in stolen Italian works between the two years, while the number of illegal archaeological excavations discovered fell from 238 in 2008 to 58 in 2009. In 2009 137 items relating to the Medici case were returned from Switzerland, recovered from the Zurich-based restorers Fritz Burki & Son, who had worked on the Euphronios Krater. These items included statues, pottery, and a first-century AD fresco. A further 300 items were still being sought in cooperation with Swiss authorities. In 2010 a statue of Zeus was recovered that had been stolen from the Museo Nazionale Romano in 1980. The force has also been active in Iraq, surveying sites at risk, providing training, developing systems, and helping to recover 2,971 objects illicitly trafficked since 1990. In 2010, in cooperation with the Swiss authorities, it managed to recover 337 artifacts of cultural heritage from Geneva, Switzerland and following exhibited the works in the Colosseum in Rome.

== Offices ==
- Rome - Palazzo Sant'Ignazio
- Ancona - Palazzo Bonarelli
- Bari - Castello Svevo
- Bologna - Palazzo Pepoli Campogrande
- Cosenza - Palazzo Arnone
- Florence - Palazzo Pitti
- Genoa - Complesso Monumentale di Sant'Ignazio
- Monza - Villa Reale
- Naples - Castel Sant'Elmo
- Palermo - Albergo delle Povere
- Sassari - Polo Museale Li Punti
- Syracuse - Castello Maniace (branch of the Palermo office)
- Turin - Palazzo Reale
- Venice - Palazzo delle Procuratie Nuove

== See also ==
- Carabinieri Specialist Units Division
- Looted art
- Archaeological looting in Iraq
- Art repatriation
- Antiquities trade
