= Giacomo Medici (art dealer) =

Italian art dealer

Giacomo Medici is an Italian antiquities smuggler and art dealer who was convicted in 2004 of dealing in stolen ancient artifacts. His operation was thought to be "one of the largest and most sophisticated antiquities networks in the world, responsible for illegally digging up and spiriting away thousands of top-drawer pieces and passing them on to the most elite end of the international art market".

== Illegal antiquities trade ==
After a long-running major investigation by the Tutela Patrimonio Culturale (or TPC, the unit of the Italian Carabinieri (military police) specializing in protecting that country's cultural heritage), Giacomo Medici was eventually charged, tried and convicted for his key role in an extensive and highly lucrative international antiquities smuggling ring.

For nearly 40 years, the group organised the systematic looting and theft of some of the most valuable Mediterranean artefacts ever found, "laundering" these stolen objects through corrupt international dealers and major auction houses, who then sold them on to major institutions and collectors around the world.

== Investigation results ==
The staggering scale and value of the so-called "Medici conspiracy" was revealed in the 1990s by two fortuitous but connected events. The first was the downfall of former Sotheby's employee James Hodges, who in 1991 was tried and convicted of various charges related to his theft of antiquities and money from his employer. Unfortunately for Sotheby's - but very fortunately for investigators - prior to his arrest, Hodges had stolen or photocopied a number of internal Sotheby's documents which indicated that the company was behaving dishonestly and unethically in regard to the trading of antiquities. After Hodges' crimes were discovered, he tried to make a deal, using the stolen documents as a bargaining tool, but when Sotheby's refused, Hodges took revenge by passing the material to investigative journalist Peter Watson. Hodges' documents sparked a series of British press investigations into Sotheby's activities, and although not conclusive in their own right, they would also provide vital corroboration for the even more sensational discoveries made by Italian authorities in the mid-1990s.

The second fortuitous event was the death of one of the smuggling ring's main organisers, Pasquale Camera, a former captain in the Italian customs agency. When Camera was killed in a car accident in August 1995, police found dozens of photographs of stolen antiquities in the glove compartment of his car, which directly linked Camera to a recent theft of valuable antiquities from an Italian regional museum. Subsequent raids by the TCP uncovered a large hoard of stolen and looted antiquities of the highest quality, as well as an extraordinary collection of documents and photographs that chronicled the smuggling ring's operations in forensic detail. Most importantly of all, the raid on the Rome apartment of one of the smugglers yielded a crucial piece of evidence that enabled the TCP to break the entire ring wide open. It was a comprehensive organisational chart, handwritten by Camera himself, which named and linked every major player in the operation, including the gangs of tombaroli (tomb robbers) and their leaders (such as Pietro Casasanta), the middle-men (including Medici) who smuggled the looted treasures out of Italy and other countries, the corrupt international dealers (including British dealer Robin Symes and American dealer Robert E. Hecht) who traded the stolen goods through major auction houses—notably Sotheby's in London—and even the unscrupulous curators, institutions, and private collectors who purchased looted goods from the gang.

The paperwork also revealed that a Swiss-based holding company named Editions Services (the successor to his earlier Hydra Galleries in Rome) was operated by a "frontman" on Medici's behalf, that Editions Services shared the same Zurich address with the antiques company owned by Symes, and that Editions Services had sold three ancient marble sculptures previously stolen from an Italian collection. On September 13, 1995, Italian and Swiss police raided the Editions Services offices at the Geneva Freeport in Geneva, Switzerland, "the special commercial zone near the airport where international goods can be stored, bought, and sold, discreetly and tax-free".

=== Looted artifacts ===
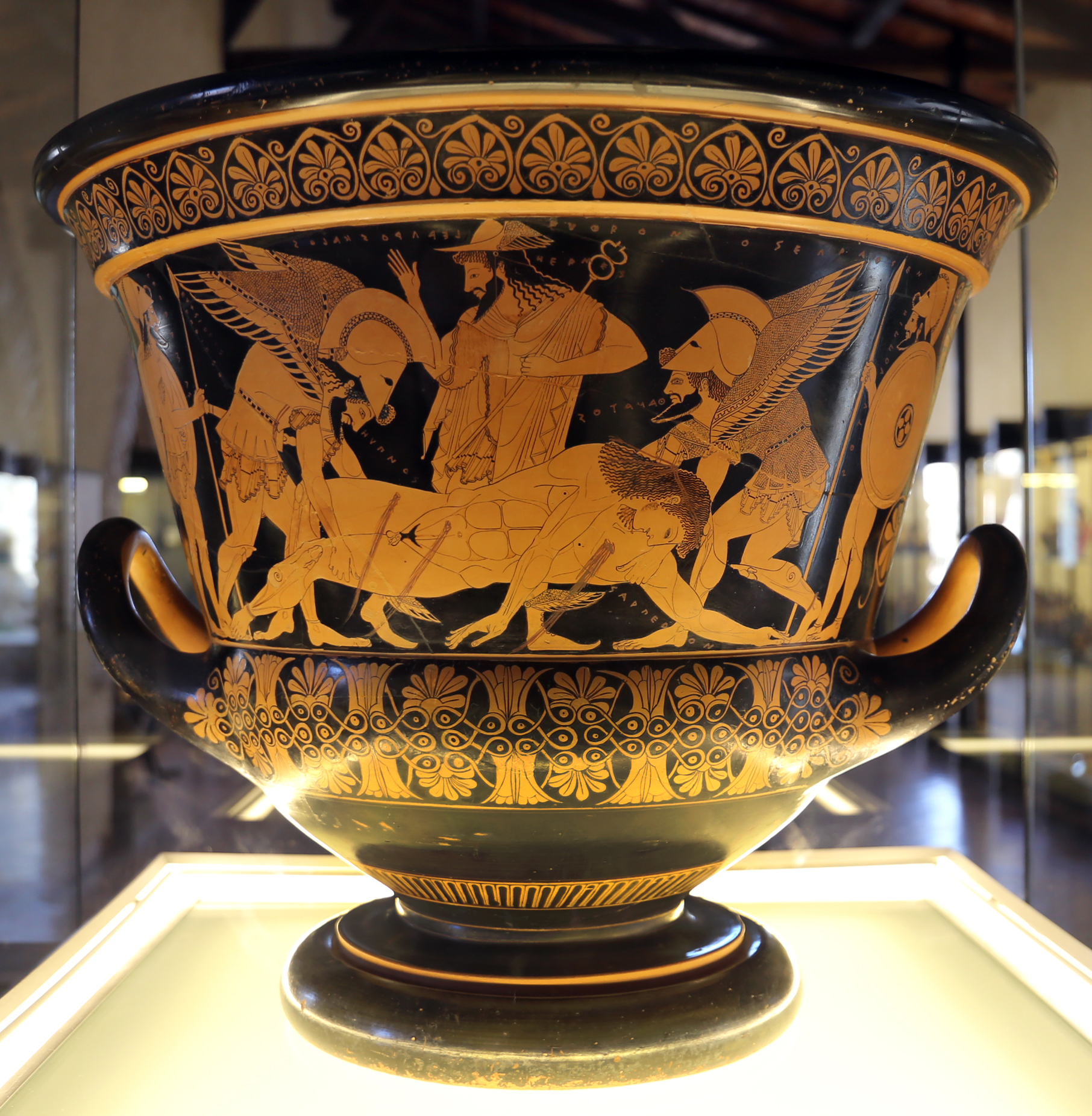
The Euphronios Krater, or "Sarpedon krater"

A notable object linked to the Medici gang is the "Sarpedon krater", a unique, signed Attic red-figure wine vessel dating from the late 6th century BCE, which was painted by Euphronios, one of the most famous ceramic artists of the ancient world. The krater was eventually shown to have been looted from a previously unknown Etruscan tomb near Cerveteri, Italy, in December 1971, and later sold to the New York Metropolitan Museum of Art in 1972 for the then record price of US$1 million.

Authorities found "hundreds of pieces of ancient Greek, Roman, and Etruscan art—including a set of Etruscan dinner plates valued at $2 million...voluminous sales records and correspondence between Medici and dealers in London and New York; and finally, binders and boxes containing thousands of photographs...of ancient objects...the archive included sequential photographs of single pieces from the moment they came out of the ground...to their finished, reconstructed appearance at the time they entered the art market and were sold for tens of thousands, and occasionally millions, of dollars. In a few cases there were even subsequent photos of the same objects inside the display cases of well-known museums".

The forensic archaeologists investigating the Medici documents even discovered shocking photographic evidence that the gang had illegally excavated and looted at least one previously-undiscovered Roman villa in Pompeii, ruthlessly hacking several complete frescoes off the walls in laptop-sized pieces in order to steal them.

== Arrest and trial ==
Medici was formally arrested in 1997, and in 2004 was sentenced by a Rome court to ten years in prison and a fine of 10 million euros, "the largest penalty ever meted out for antiquities crime in Italy".

In 2005, evidence from the Geneva raid was used by the Italian government to indict American antiquities dealer Robert E. Hecht and former J. Paul Getty Museum curator of antiquities Marion True for conspiracy to traffic in illegal antiquities. The court hearings of the case against Hecht and True ended in 2012 and 2010, respectively, as the statute of limitations, under Italian law, for their alleged crimes had expired.

== Book ==
Medici's operation is detailed in Peter Watson and Cecilia Todeschini's 2006 book The Medici Conspiracy: The Illicit Journey of Looted Antiquities from Italy's Tomb Raiders to the World's Greatest Museums.
