= Ka-Nefer-Nefer =

Ancient Egyptian noble

Ka-Nefer-Nefer (fl. 13th century BCE) was an ancient Egyptian noblewoman who lived during the Nineteenth Dynasty. She is known in modern times for her funerary mask, which is in the possession of the Saint Louis Art Museum. The museum bought the mask in 1998 from the art supplier Phoenix Ancient Art of New York and Geneva. The art supplier said that the mask had been excavated at Saqqara between 1951 and 1952 and had been on the art market by 1952. However, suspicions arose that the mask had instead been stolen from Egypt, and Zahi Hawass, Secretary-General of the Egyptian Supreme Council of Antiquities, asked that the mask be returned to Egypt. In 2006, the Saint Louis Art Museum rejected Hawass' claim, and the mask remains in Saint Louis.

Ka-Nefer-Nefer's mask is made of painted and gilded plaster-coated linen over wood. It resides in a climate-controlled case labeled "Mummy Mask, Egyptian, Dynasty 19" at the Saint Louis Art Museum.

Ka-Nefer-Nefer was discovered in 1952 by Mohammed Zakaria Goneim in a tomb buried above the Step Pyramid of Djoser in the Saqqara necropolis. Her body was not mummified and was badly decomposed, and she wore an elaborate mask that covered her head and shoulders. Her head was crowned with a glass diadem; her eyes and nipples were also covered with glass. Goneim named her Ka-Nefer-Nefer, meaning "Twice-Beautiful Ka". On June 12, 2014, the US Eight Circuit appeals court concluded that the mask will remain at the St. Louis Art Museum, at least as far as the US federal forfeiture case is concerned.

== See also ==
- Portraiture in ancient Egypt
