= Geneva Freeport =

Large art storage facility

- Ports Francs et Entrepôts de Genève
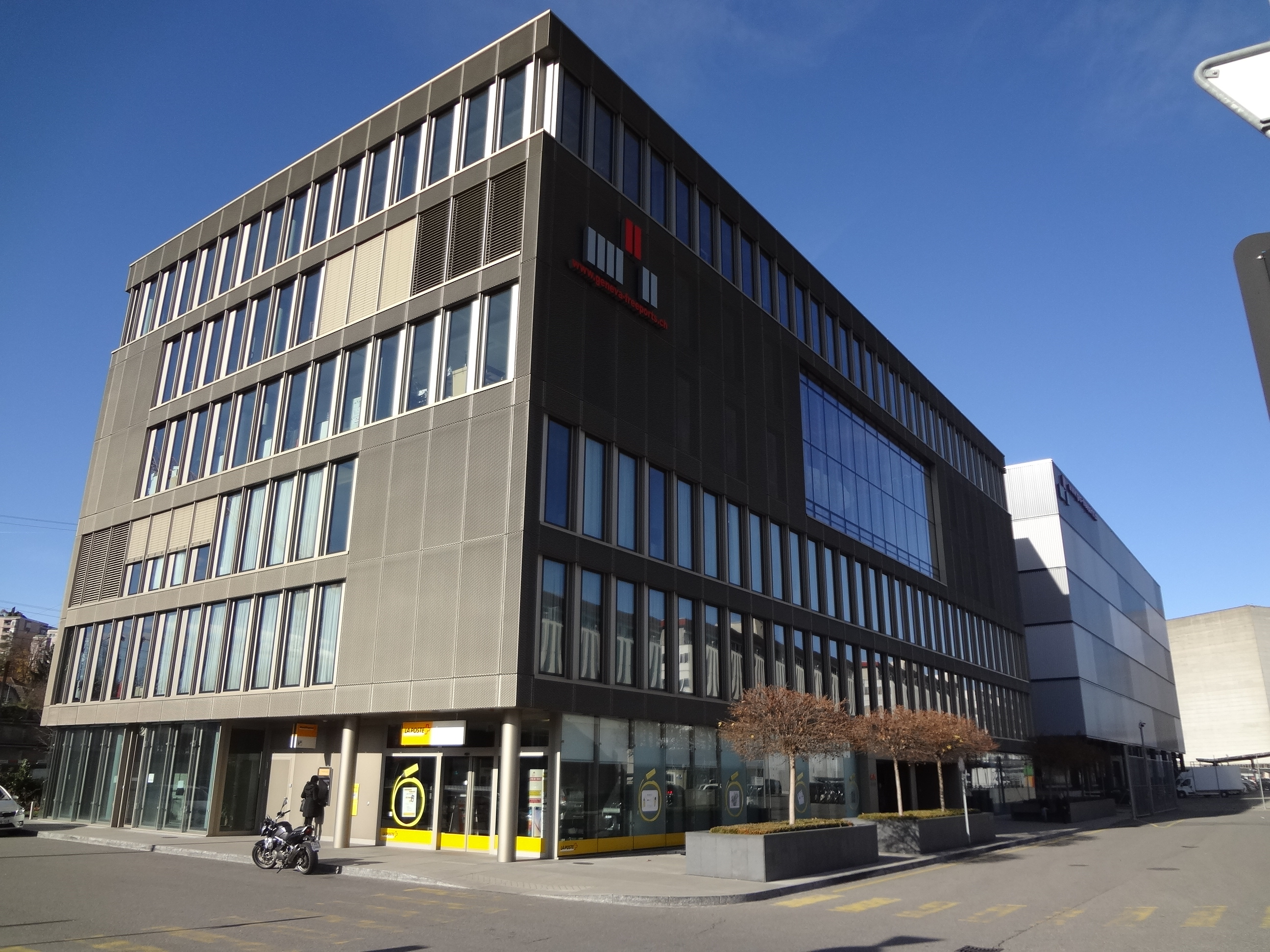

- Location within Switzerland

General information
- Location: Geneva, Switzerland
- Coordinates: 46.1881°N 6.1262°E

Website
- geneva-freeports.ch

Geneva Freeport (French: Ports Francs et Entrepôts de Genève SA) is a warehouse complex in Geneva, Switzerland, for the storage of art and other valuables and collectibles. It is the world's oldest and largest freeport facility, and the one with the most artworks, with 40% of its collection being art with an estimated value of US$100 billion.

The freeport became the preferred storage facility for the international elite due to the opacity of Switzerland's storage and customs laws, but has since come under scrutiny for its complicity in the looted antiquities trade and money-laundering schemes. The facility's holdings, especially those possibly related to tax avoidance, have been subject to increasing scrutiny since the release of the Panama Papers in 2016. Recent laws passed in Switzerland have aimed at increasing the transparency of the freeport's contents, discouraging long-term storage there.

The freeport has been described as "a trailblazer in the luxury freeport business", as such tax-avoidance complexes have proliferated across the world amid a multilateral clampdown on banking secrecy.

== History ==
The Freeport's origins can be traced back to 1888, but as it expanded in size, it adopted the "opaque traditions of Swiss banking", making it the preferred storage facility for the international elite. Freeports are designed to reduce barriers to trade by decreasing the amount of transactional events at which some customs or tax might be collected. Goods stored in freeports are understood to be “in transit”, meaning that an owner defers customs duties and tax liabilities until the goods leave the warehouse.

According to an article in The New Yorker, Swiss businessman Yves Bouvier pioneered the freeport concept parallel to the art market, making his shipping company Natural Le Coultre the freeport's largest tenant, with storage space rented in excess of 20,000 m^{2} since 2013.

Bouvier, dubbed the "freeport king", is the majority investor in the Singapore and Luxembourg freeports and has been variously described as the owner of the Geneva Freeport, or its largest shareholder, although in an interview in October 2016 he said he owned only 5% of it, and that 85% was owned by the Swiss state.

Canton of Geneva is the Freeport's majority shareholder, but leases the facility to a private firm that operates it. A space that can hold a medium-sized painting costs approximately US$1,000 per month; a small room for multiple objects is US$5,000–12,000.

After the 2008 financial crisis and recession, there was a large surge in art collecting and demand for freeport space. Art was seen as a safe investment, and wealthy people began acquiring greater amounts of it to sell at later dates.

In 2013, the Freeport held about 1.2 million works of art, allegedly including around 1000 works by Pablo Picasso. As well as art and gold bars, it contains about three million bottles of wine.

In 2009, the first gallery inside the Freeport was opened by Simon Studer. Other galleries include those run by Sandra Recio. In 2013, it was reported that a 10,000 m^{2} extension would open in 2014.

== Use in international art crime ==
On September 13, 1995, Swiss and Italian law enforcement (Carabinieri) raided Giacomo Medici’s large storage room in a warehouse in Geneva Freeport. It was rented to Edition Services, a company owned by Medici. Agents found over 3,800 antiquities, worth an estimated $35 million, many with dirt still attached to them, and documents relating to art dealers and museums in Europe and North America. The antiquities had been illegally excavated in Italy and smuggled to the Swiss border. To circumvent Swiss customs authorities, Medici attached provenances to the objects, often attributing them to an anonymous Swiss private collection, claiming they were removed from Italy decades earlier. He then secured legal Swiss export papers for them, sent them to the United States for sale, and arranged for them to be returned to Switzerland, effectively creating a tight provenance. The discovery led to the conviction of Medici in May 2005 for "receiving stolen goods, illegal export of goods, and conspiracy to traffic" in May 2005. The incident led to a major breakthrough in global awareness of looted antiquities and the arrests of other major players in the trade. It also implicated a variety of museums in the purchasing of looted antiquities, including the Getty Center in Los Angeles and the Metropolitan Museum of Art in New York City.

Although the discovery of Medici's storeroom prompted the tightening of Swiss customs and freeport laws, the holdings of the Geneva Freeport were still quite opaque and art crimes continued to occur there. In 2003, Geneva police discovered 200 ancient Egyptian artifacts there that had been illegally exported to Switzerland, smuggled out of Egypt through a complicated network of smugglers including 15 Egyptians, two Swiss, two Germans, and a Canadian. When they shipped the antiquities, the smugglers claimed that they were exporting souvenirs from a tourist bazaar in Cairo. They were stored at the Geneva Freeport until they could be sold to European and North American museums.

In 2010, Swiss customs officers discovered a Roman sarcophagus in the Geneva Freeport that had been looted from a site in Southern Turkey.

In 2013, nine antiquities looted from Palmyra in Syria and ancient sites in Libya and Yemen were seized by Swiss authorities when they were found during a customs inspection at the Freeport. The objects were deposited there between 2009 and 2010. Six of them are believed to have been transported to Switzerland from Qatar, and another from the United Arab Emirates. This opened a debate on the Freeport's role in funding the terrorist activities of groups such as ISIS, which is suspected of depositing looted objects of ancient art in the facility via middlemen.

In November 2015 the director of the Louvre, Jean-Luc Martinez, submitted a report on the protection of cultural heritage to UNESCO that denounced the role of the Geneva, Luxembourg and Singapore Freeports in the trafficking of stolen cultural goods. However, the European Commission's response to the report, in a meeting chaired by Luxembourg, "took great care not to mention the case of the freeports".

In January 2016, officers from the Art Crimes squad of the Italian Carabinieri, in collaboration with Swiss authorities, raided a storage unit that British antiquities dealer Robin Symes rented at the Geneva Freeport. It was found to contain a huge quantity of stolen antiquities, nearly all of which were believed to have been looted by the Medici gang from Etruscan- and Roman-era archaeological sites in Italy and other locations over at least 40 years. Packed inside 45 crates, investigators discovered some 17,000 Greek, Roman and Etruscan artefacts, including two stunning Etruscan terracotta sarcophagi, topped by painted, life-sized reclining figures; hundreds of whole or fragmentary pieces of rare Greek and Roman pottery, statuary and bas-reliefs: fragments of a fresco from Pompeii; and a marble head of Apollo thought to have been looted from the Baths of Claudius near Rome. The artifacts were estimated to be worth hundreds of millions of pounds, with the head of Apollo alone valued at £30 million (US$44 million). Symes is alleged to have hidden the objects at the Geneva Freeport soon after his partner's death, to conceal them from the executors of his estate and keep their huge value out of any settlement.

In April 2016, Geneva prosecutors opened a criminal probe into the ownership of Modigliani’s “Seated Man with a Cane” in storage at the Freeport, and seized the painting to determine its origins. It was allegedly looted by the Nazis from its original owner, Parisian art dealer Oscar Stettiner, who died before he could retrieve it, and its whereabouts were unknown until it appeared at an auction in 2008 but didn't sell. Its current owner, art collector David Nahmad, stated that he had obtained it in 1996 and that no evidence linking it to Stettiner existed.

Many of the paintings acquired by the primary suspect in Malaysia’s 1MDB corruption scandal, Jho Low, were stored at the Freeport when they were forfeited in 2016.

In a 2018 report, the European Commission observed that increases in demand for freeports was positively correlated to stricter banking regulations, where freeports continue to offer the most secrecy, making them hotspots for crime. It cited the Bouvier Affair and the Geneva Freeport as examples.

On 26 March 2019, the European Parliament adopted the final report of the Special Committee on Financial Crimes, Tax Evasion and Tax Avoidance (TAX3), which the committee had adopted on 27 February 2019. The report stressed that freeports provided "a safe and widely disregarded storage space, where trade can be conducted untaxed and ownership be concealed", leading the EP to call for freeports to be closed across the EU to fight tax evasion and money laundering.

== Laws governing the Geneva Freeport ==
Freeports in Switzerland have historically enjoyed little government regulation. However, after the 1995 discovery of Medici's warehouse and the 2003 discovery of Egyptian artifacts, Switzerland began to impose tighter laws on the Freeport and the objects in it. In 2003, the Cultural Property Transfer Act (CPTA) allowed Switzerland to ratify the 1970 UNESCO Convention on the Means of Prohibiting and Preventing the Illicit Import, Export and Transfer of Ownership of Cultural Property; and in 2005, an ordinance was passed that required all cultural property imported into Switzerland to have its origin, ownership, and value declared. Since 2009, Swiss law has required the Freeport's managers to maintain inventories of its contents and the names of its owners, and has given customs officials the power to conduct inspections.

Following these laws' implementation, the Geneva Freeport continued to be implicated in cases involving looted antiquities and other stolen artworks. In an attempt to further close avenues for illicit trade in cultural property, Switzerland adopted new regulations in 2016 with the passage of the Swiss Anti-Money Laundering Regulation and the Swiss Customs Act.

The Anti-Money Laundering Regulation aims to introduce greater transparency into transactions by providing two options: The first is for traders to involve a financial intermediary—meaning a credit card company or bank—in their transactions, removing the anonymity that cash transactions allow. The intermediary receives a record of the activity which enters the payment system and its mechanisms for detecting fraud. The second option allows the buyer and seller to keep their identities and transaction confidential but requires the seller to take steps to ensure the legality of the buyer's funds.

The Swiss Customs Act imposed a six-month time limit on goods stored in the Freeport, forcing its managers to identify owners in the warehouse's inventory records. The act encourages a high rate of turnover but is limited in its effectiveness by allowing customs to extend time limits on stored objects.

== Effect on the art world ==
The Freeport's holdings have been described as the "greatest art collection that nobody gets to see". Prominent art-world figures have raised concerns that countless and priceless pieces of art are stored away from public view and treated as investments, meaning they may as well not exist. Eli Broad, a major contemporary art collector, stated that "treating art as a commodity and just hiding it in storage is something that to me is not really moral."
