= Euphronios Krater =

Ancient Greek red-figure vase from Athens c. 515 BC

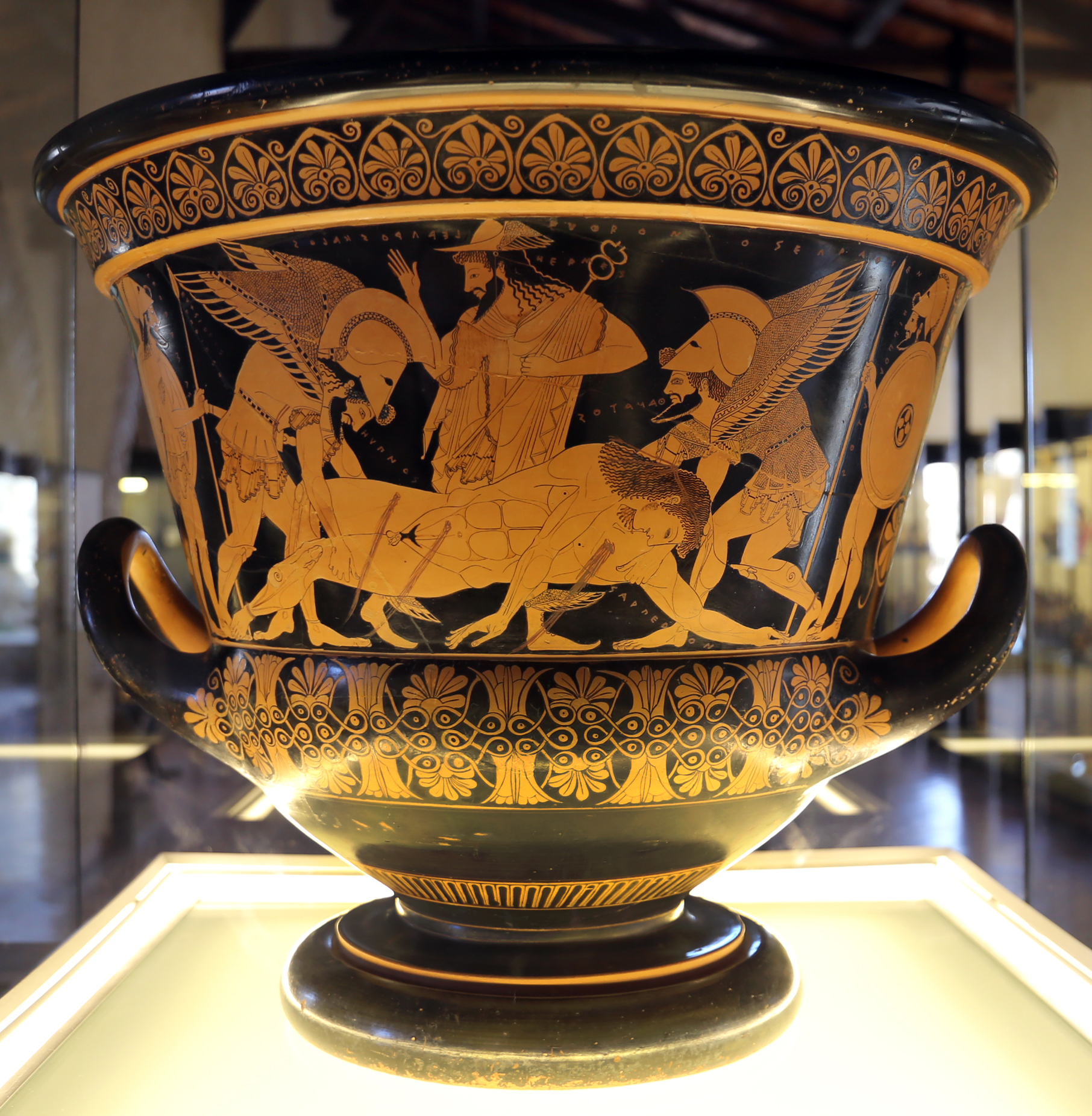
The Euphronios Krater

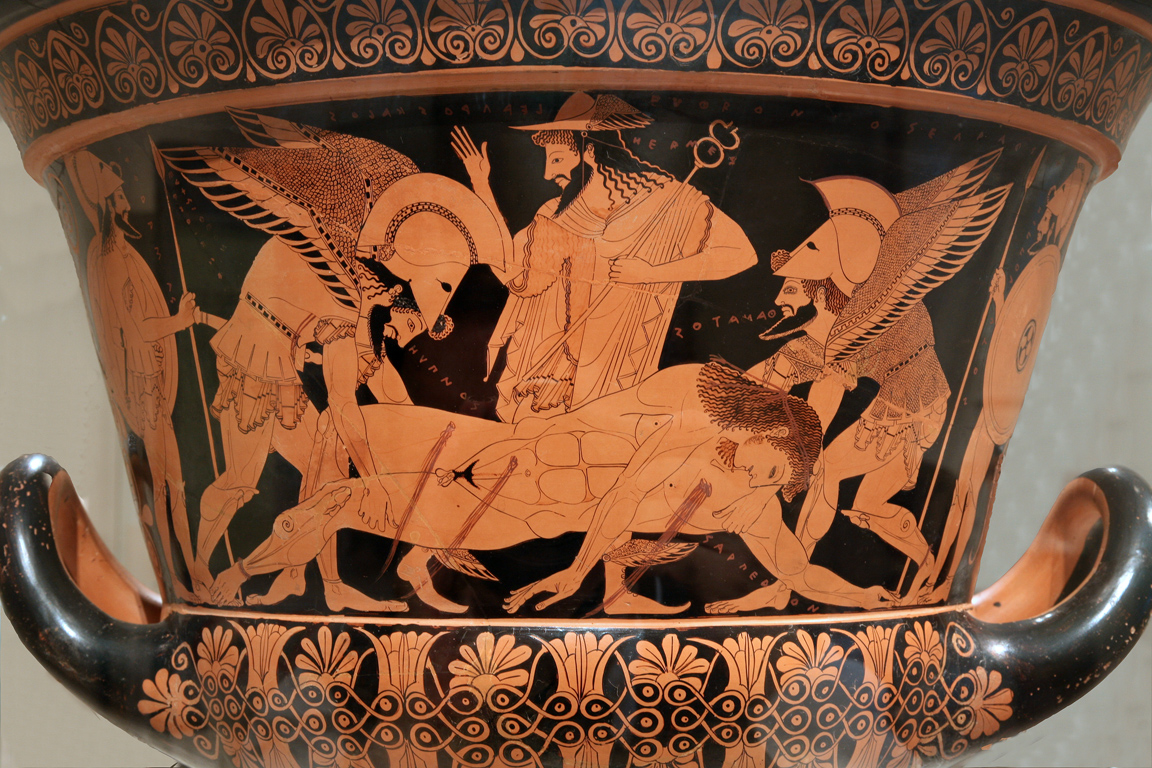
Front side depicting Sarpedon's body carried by Hypnos and Thanatos (Sleep and Death), while Hermes watches

The Euphronios Krater (or Sarpedon Krater) is an ancient Greek terra cotta calyx-krater, a bowl used for mixing wine with water. Created around 515 BC, it is the only complete example of the 27 vases painted by the renowned Euphronios and is considered one of the finest Ancient Greek vases in existence.

Illegally excavated from an Etruscan cemetery near Cerveteri, it was part of the collection of the Metropolitan Museum of Art in New York from 1972 to 2008, until repatriated to Italy under an agreement negotiated in February 2006. It is now in the collection of the National Archaeological Museum of Cerveteri as part of a policy of returning stolen works of art to their place of origin.

== Description ==
The Euphronios Krater stands 45.7 centimetres (18.0 in) in height and has a diameter of 55.1 centimetres (21.7 in). It can hold about 45 litres (9.9 imp gal; 12 US gal). The style of the vase is red-figure pottery, in which figure outlines, details, and the background are painted with an opaque black slip while the figures themselves are left in the color of the unpainted terracotta ceramic clay.

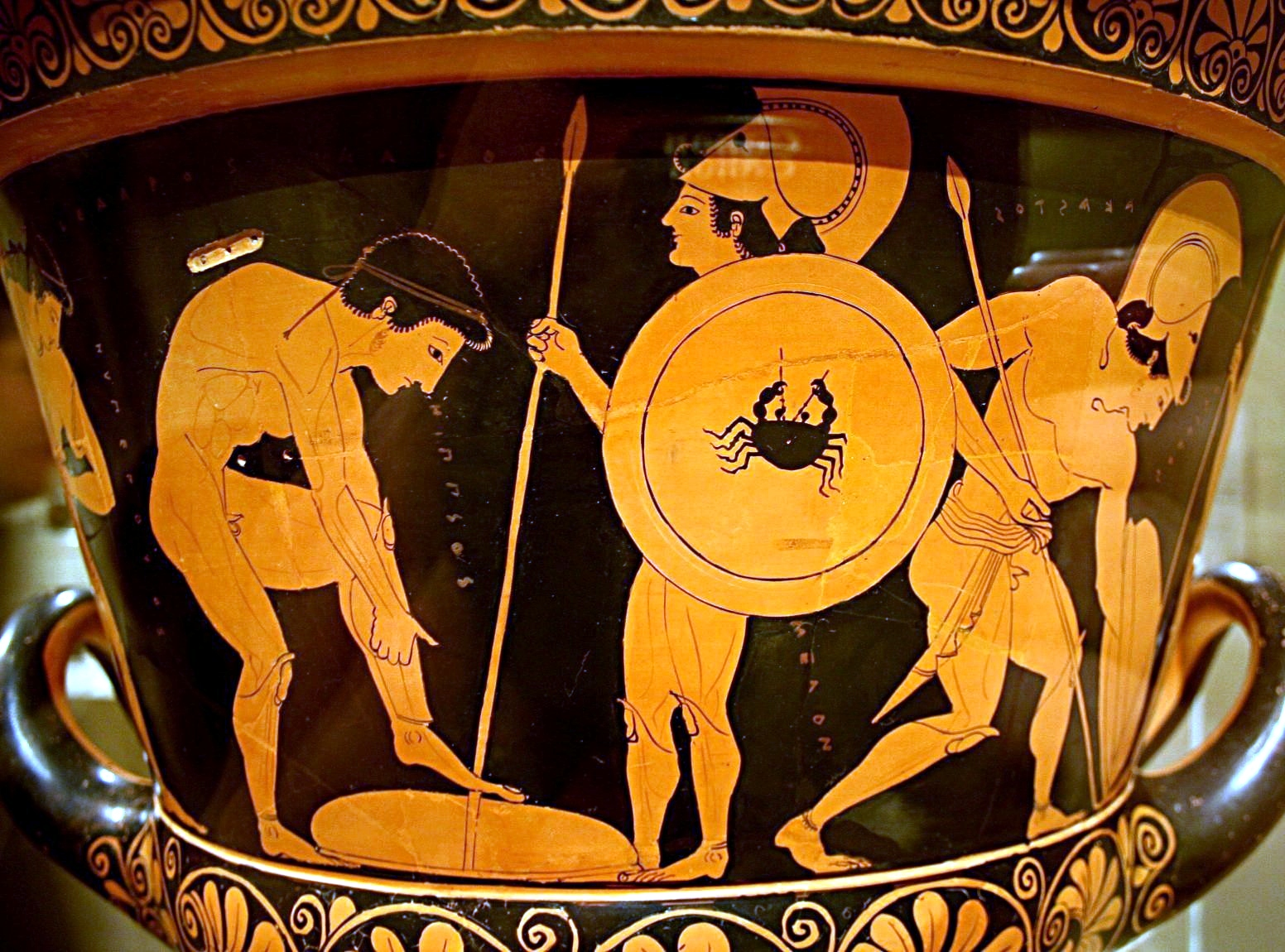
Reverse side depicting Athenian youths arming themselves

The krater is decorated with two scenes. An episode from the Trojan War is shown on the obverse; this illustration depicts the death of Sarpedon, son of Zeus and Laodamia. The reverse of the krater shows a contemporary scene of Athenian youths from the sixth century BC arming themselves before battle. In the scene of Sarpedon's death, the god Hermes directs the personifications of Sleep (Hypnos) and Death (Thanatos) to carry the fallen away to his homeland for burial. While the subject of Sarpedon's death might normally be depicted as a stylized tableau, the figures in this scene are painted in naturalistic poses and with schematic but accurate anatomy. This style is emblematic of the Pioneer Group of late Archaic painters, of whom Euphronios is considered the most accomplished. The scene of the anonymous Greek youths on the reverse shares this naturalistic style, using all the Pioneer Group's characteristic techniques of anatomical accuracy, natural poses, foreshortening, and spatial illusion.

Also characteristic of the Pioneer Group is the narrative tension created both by pairing these two scenes on the same piece and by painting them in a common style. The death of Sarpedon, a quasi-mythological story which would be familiar to anyone viewing the krater, is an episode involving specific historical and mythological figures. The other scene, of the anonymous youths preparing for war, is both more general and explicitly contemporary. The young men are not heroes of legend; with their finely detailed features, they are given personality and character, but they could be any of the youthful soldiers in the Greek army. Both scenes are painted with similar styles, making the historical scene appear more contemporary; likewise, the contemporary scene begins to share some of the other's mythological qualities. The two scenes invite comparison between the narratives they depict; certainly, the hero Sarpedon was no less youthful than these anonymous boys, and Death and Sleep may well come for them as they did for him.

The vase is signed both by Euxitheos as potter and Euphronios as painter. While it was customary for the painter to sign the finished work, it was less common for the potter to add his own name. The presence of both signatures indicates that Euxitheos felt the vase to be one of his finest works. Besides the artists' signatures on the obverse side, it also carries the inscription "Leagros is handsome" on the reverse. This inscription has allowed art historians to date the krater to approximately 520–510 BC, because at this time Leagros was considered the handsomest man in Greece. All names are written in Attic letters.

== History ==
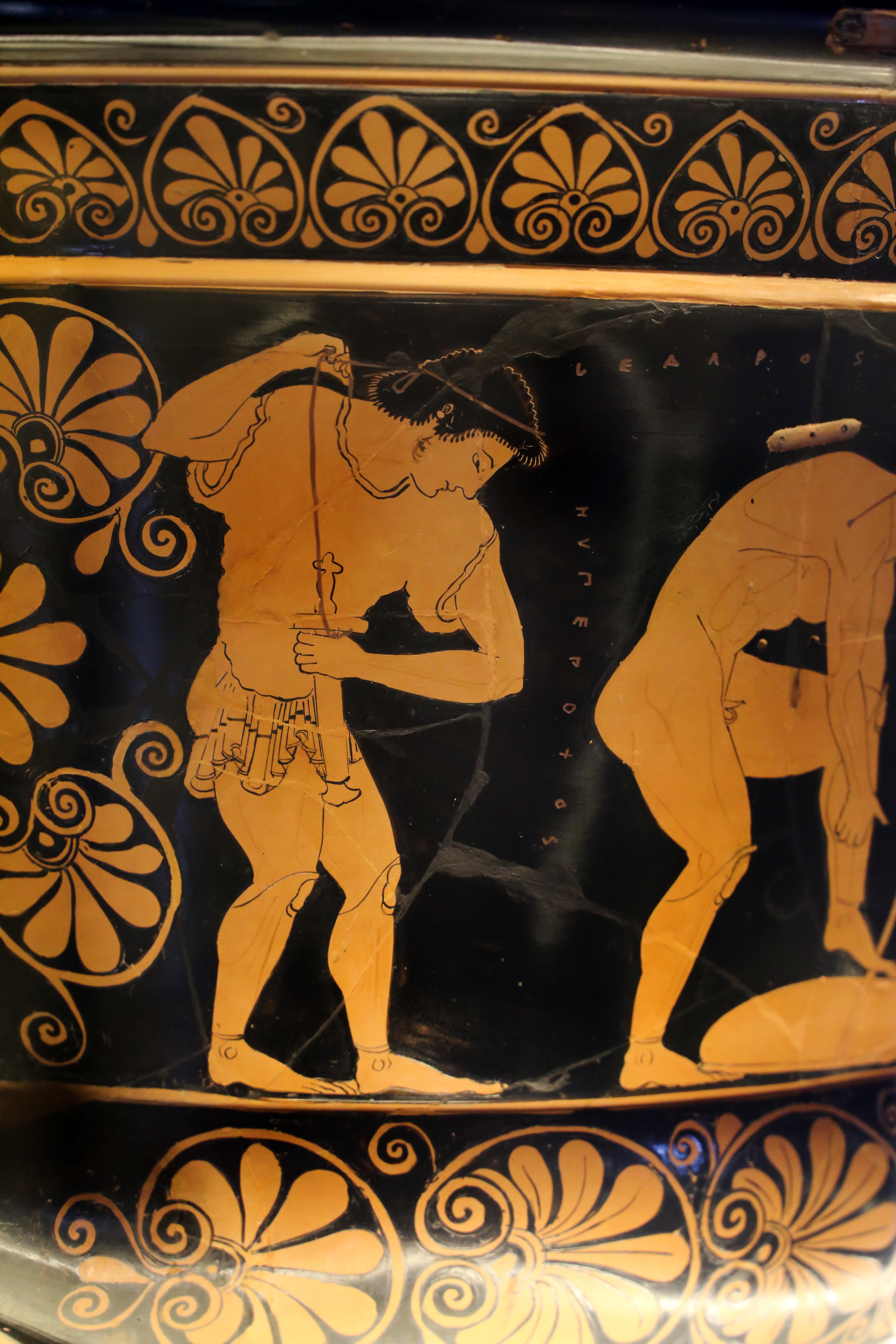
Detail

Records in Italian courts of an investigation indicate that the krater was looted from an Etruscan tomb in the Greppe Sant'Angelo near Cerveteri in December 1971. The krater was sold to the Metropolitan Museum of Art by Robert E. Hecht, an American antiquities dealer living in Rome, for US$1.2 million on November 10, 1972. Hecht, who was accused of trafficking in illicit antiquities, claimed to have acquired the krater from Dikran Sarrafian, a Lebanese dealer, whose family had been in possession of the piece since 1920. Evidence suggests that Hecht may have purchased the krater in 1972 from Giacomo Medici, an Italian dealer who was convicted of selling stolen art in 2005. Hecht denied the charges.

Thomas Hoving, director of the Met and the primary negotiator in the purchase, later said in his memoirs, Making the Mummies Dance, "An intact red-figured Greek vase of the early sixth century B.C. could only have been found in Etruscan territory in Italy, by illegal excavators". To allay concerns, some six months after the krater was bought he prompted the Metropolitan Museum to send a private detective to Zurich in an endeavor to reinforce the cited Sarrafian provenance.

In 2006, following the trial of Giacomo Medici and related disclosures about antiquities smuggling, the Metropolitan Museum of Art and the Italian government signed an agreement under which ownership of the Euphronios Krater and several other pieces of art was returned to Italy in exchange for long-term loans of other comparable objects owned by Italy. The krater remained on display at the Metropolitan Museum until January 2008, when it returned to Italy. It was unveiled in Rome on 18 January. The krater was displayed at the Villa Giulia National Etruscan Museum in Rome from 2008–14 until it was moved as part of a temporary display in the Cerveteri Museum celebrating the UNESCO World Heritage Site affiliation for the necropolis at Banditaccia. Following the increase of attendance at the museum, the Cultural Heritage Minister, Dario Franceschini, has announced that the krater will remain at the Archaeological Museum of Cerveteri as part of a strategy of returning works of art to their place of origin.

Details from the krater's obverse have been used as a book cover illustration. The Penguin Classics deluxe edition of Robert Fagles' English translation of the Iliad employs a close-up of Thanatos for its front cover, and a close-up of Sarpedon for its back cover.
