= Antiquities trade =

Exchange of classical and pre-classical artifacts

The antiquities trade is the exchange of antiquities and archaeological artifacts from around the world. This trade may be illicit or completely legal. The legal antiquities trade abides by national regulations, allowing for extraction of artifacts for scientific study whilst maintaining archaeological and anthropological context. The illicit antiquities trade involves non-scientific extraction that ignores the archaeological and anthropological context from the artifacts.

== Legal trade ==
The legal trade in antiquities abide by the laws of the countries in which the artifacts originate. These laws establish how the antiquities may be extracted from the ground and the legal process in which artifacts may leave the country. In many countries excavations and exports were prohibited without official licenses already in the 19th century, as for example in the Ottoman Empire. According to the laws of the countries of origin, there can't be a legal trade with archaeological artifact without official papers. However, most national laws still overturn these regulations.

== History ==
Antiquity (ca. 3000 BC – 500 AD): During antiquity, trade in antiquities and artefacts played an important role in the exchange between different civilizations and cultures. Greek and Roman artworks were traded throughout Europe, North Africa and the Middle East. This trade often took place in the context of diplomatic relations, military conquests and trade routes. Ancient port cities such as Alexandria, Rome and Athens served as important centers for the trade in art and other goods.

Middle Ages (ca. 500 AD – 1500 AD): During the Middle Ages, the trade in antiquities became less important as European society was characterized by political instability, cultural change and economic difficulties. Many ancient works of art were destroyed, lost or reused, and trade in them was less pronounced than in antiquity. Nevertheless, some ancient works of art were treasured as valuable relics of the past and kept by aristocratic collectors and churches.

Renaissance (14th to 17th century): The Renaissance was a time of cultural and intellectual awakening in Europe, during which there was a renewed interest in antiquity. Antiquities were valued and collected by scholars, artists and collectors. The trade in antiquities flourished again and some objects were recovered from ancient Roman villas and ruins and kept in private collections. Renaissance princes and nobles collected ancient sculptures, paintings and coins to demonstrate their status and sophistication.

Baroque period (17th and 18th centuries): Antiquities were also collected and traded during the Baroque period, with Roman sculptures and Greek vases being particularly sought after. Collectors such as kings, nobles and wealthy citizens expanded their art collections and promoted the trade in antiquities. The demand for antiquities led to the discovery and excavation of further ancient sites, particularly in Italy and Greece. The sons and daughters of the European aristocracy, and later also the upper middle classes, visited ancient sites on the Grand Tour (Cavalier Tour or Cavaliers' Journey) and purchased the highest quality ancient works of art possible in the respective countries.

Classicism and Neoclassicism (18th and 19th centuries): In the 18th and 19th centuries, the trade in antiquities reached a peak as Classicism and later Neoclassicism influenced art production and aesthetics. Ancient Greek and Roman art served as a model for contemporary artists and formed the basis for art movements such as Classicism and Neoclassicism. Collectors, museums and public institutions acquired antiquities. In the 18th century, there was a flourishing trade in antiquities, particularly in Rome. Johann Joachim Winckelmann was appointed superintendent of all antiquities (Commissario delle Antichità) in and around Rome in 1763. One of his tasks was to control the antiquities trade.

Over the course of the 19th and 20th centuries, auction houses such as Christie's and Sotheby's established themselves as major players in the antique art trade, with numerous antique objects being offered at auction. Today, the antiquities trade remains an important part of the global art market, and collectors and institutions continue to collect and research antique objects.

=== Regulation ===
Through the 19th and 20th centuries nation states introduced laws restricting excavation, the export, and ownership of Antiquities.

==== Egypt ====
The Antiquities trade was regulated through:

- 1835 - Mohamed Ali's ordinance restricting the export of Antiquities.
- 1869 - Law further restricting export of Antiquities.
- 1874 - Law asserting discovered Antiquities belonged to the state.
- 1880 - decree declaring all Antiquities the property of the state.
- 1912 - Egyptian Antiquities Law No. 14 - ownership, or their value, of discovered antiquities would be split equally between the excavator and the Cairo museum.
- 1924 - Law modified to award the excavator ownership of only the artefacts the Cairo Museum doesn't desire.

== Illicit trade ==
Illicit or illegal antiquities are those found in illegal or unregulated excavations, and traded covertly. The black market trade of illicit antiquities is supplied by looting and art theft. Artifacts are often those that have been discovered and unearthed at archeological digs and then transported internationally through a middleman to often unsuspecting collectors, museums, antique dealers, and auction houses. The antiquities trade is much more careful in recent years about establishing the provenance of cultural artifacts. Some estimates of billions of dollars in annual sales are demonstrably false.

The true extent of the trade is unknown as incidents of looting are underreported. It is not unheard of for stolen pieces to be found in auction houses before they have been noticed as missing from their original home.

It is believed by many archaeologists and cultural heritage lawyers that the demand created by circulation, marketing, and collectorship of ancient artifacts causes the continuous looting and destruction of archaeological sites around the world. Archaeological artifacts are internationally protected by the Hague Convention for the Protection of Cultural Property in the Event of Armed Conflict and international trade in cultural property of dubious provenance is restricted by the UNESCO Convention (1970) on the Means of Prohibiting and Preventing the Illicit Import, Export and Transfer of Ownership of Cultural Property. After years of resistance, the United States played a major role in drafting and promoting the 1970 Convention.

Examples of looting of archaeological sites for the black market:

- Archaeological looting in Iraq
- Archaeological looting in Romania
- Maya stelae looting

=== Response ===
The protection of antiquities necessitates the formulation and implementation of comprehensive public policies. These policies address issues such as provenance, looting prevention, and repatriation, ensuring the ethical circulation of historical artifacts. On 16 November 1972, UNESCO adopted the international Convention Concerning the Protection of the World Cultural and Natural Heritage.

The export of antiquities is now heavily controlled by law in almost all countries and by the 1970 UNESCO Convention on the Means of Prohibiting and Preventing the Illicit Import, Export and Transfer of Ownership of Cultural Property, but a large and increasing trade in illicit antiquities continues. Further complicating matters is the existence of archaeological forgeries, such as the Etruscan terracotta warriors, the Persian Princess, and the Getty kouros.

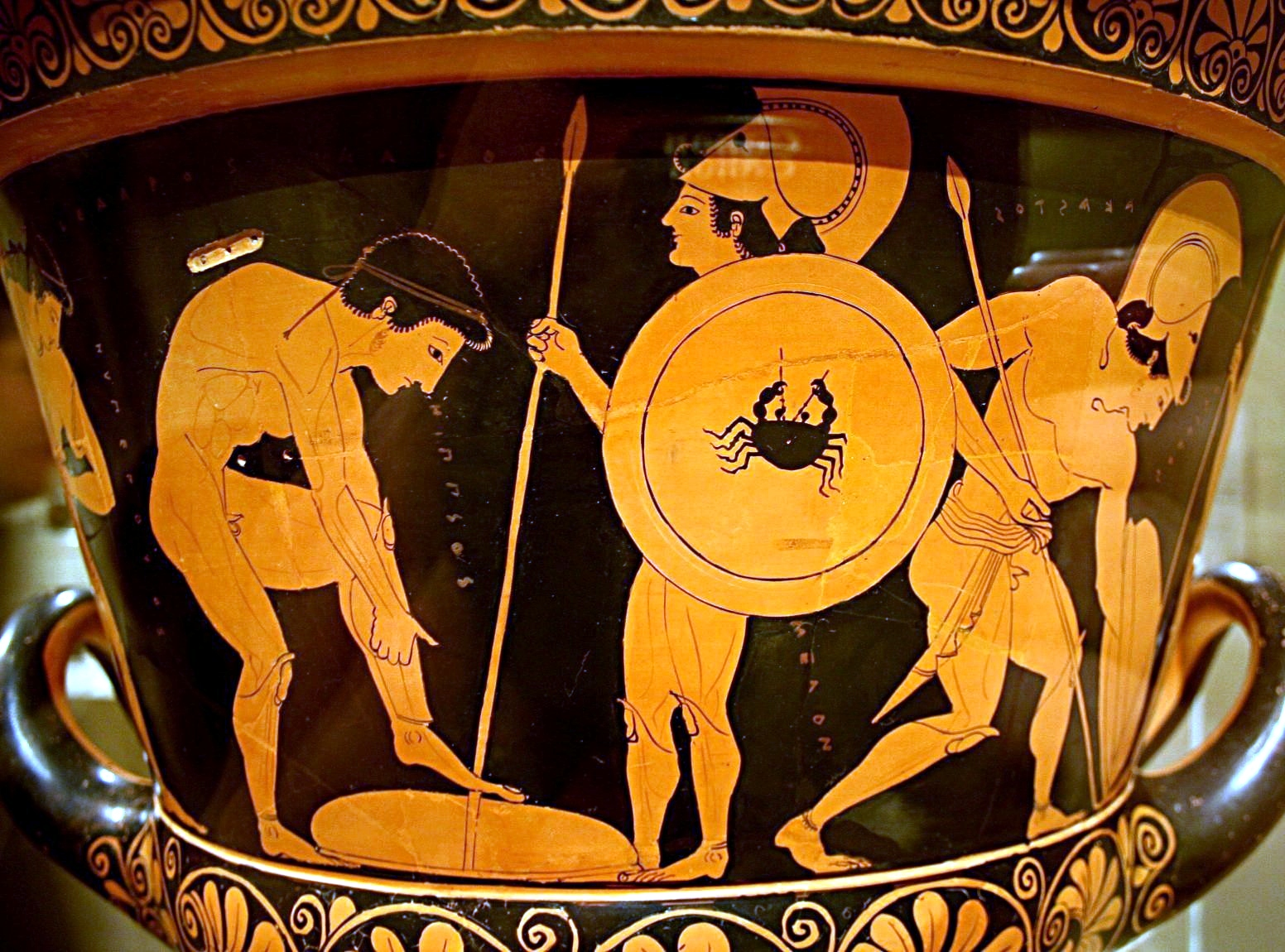
The Euphronios Krater has been returned to Italy by the Metropolitan Museum of Art.

There has been a growing effort to repatriate artifacts illicitly obtained and traded on the international market and return them to their countries of origin and preserve their cultural value. Such artifacts include those held by museums such as the Getty Museum (e.g. Victorious Youth) and the Metropolitan Museum of Art (e.g. Euphronios Krater). In July 2023, a repatriation ceremony was held at the Indian Consulate in New York City to celebrate the handing over of 105 trafficked antiquities to India. The countries had agreed to prevent illegal trafficking of cultural artefacts during Prime Minister Modi's state visit to US. The artifacts span a period from the 2nd to 19th centuries. Around 50 of them have religious significance.

To combat looting, aerial surveillance - the effectiveness of which depends on the capability to perform systematic prospections - is increasingly being used. It is sometimes impractical, due to military activity, political restrictions, the vastness of the area, difficult environments, etc. Space technology could offer a suitable alternative, as in the case of Peru, where an Italian scientific mission directed by Nicola Masini has since 2008 been using very high resolution satellite data to observe and monitor the phenomenon of huaqueros (archaeological looting) in some archaeological areas in southern and northern Peru. The U.S. Government Accountability Office issued a report describing some of the United States’ cultural property protection efforts.

== The ICIJ "Hidden Treasures" investigation ==
In 2022 the International Consortium of Investigative Journalists (ICIJ) began publishing a series of articles about antiquities trafficking as part of the Hidden Treasures project. In a joint investigation with The Indian Express, the ICIJ published a list of more than 1000 cultural heritage objects linked to antiquities trafficker Subhash Kapoor. The ICIJ also ran features on artworks in private collections that had been looted from Cambodia as well as looted artworks that had passed through the Douglas Latchford looting and laundering network. The revelations in these and other investigative reports caused museums and collectors in several countries to relinquish looted art and to hire provenance researchers.

== Antiquities Trafficking Unit Investigations ==
The Antiquities Trafficking Unit (ATU), led by Matthew Bogdanos in conjunction with the Manhattan D.A. initiated numerous criminal investigations into the antiquities smuggling. Numerous repatriations of stolen cultural heritage have resulted. In 2024 the Cleveland Museum of Art sued the Manhattan D.A. in order to stop its "seizure in place" of a bronze statue that had been looted from Turkey, known as "The Emperor as Philosopher, probably Marcus Aurelius (reigned AD 161-180)c. 180-200" or "Draped Male Figure". In 2025 the museum announced it would relinquish the statue as a result of new scientific evidence proving its illicit origins.

== See also ==
- Antiquities Coalition
