= Zi Wei =

Zi Wei may refer to:

- Zi Wei (crater), on the Moon
- Ziwei enclosure, or the Purple Forbidden enclosure, a constellation in Chinese astronomy
- Ziwei Emperor, or Great Emperor of the North Star, a sky deity of Taoism

== See also ==
- Ziwe (disambiguation)
- Ziwei Bridge, a historic stone arch bridge over the Cangji River in Zhejiang, China
- Ziwei doushu or Zi Wei Dou Shu, a form of fortune-telling in Chinese culture
- Ziwiyeh Castle, in Saqqez, Iran
