= Ziwe =

Ziwe may refer to:

- Ziwe Fumudoh (Ziwerekoru Fumudoh, born 1992) American comedian and writer
- Ziwe (talk show), a 2021–2022 American satirical show hosted by Ziwe Fumudoh

== See also ==
- Zi Wei (disambiguation)
- Ziwiyeh Castle, in Saqqez, Iran
