= Oscar White Muscarella =

American archaeologist (1931–2022)

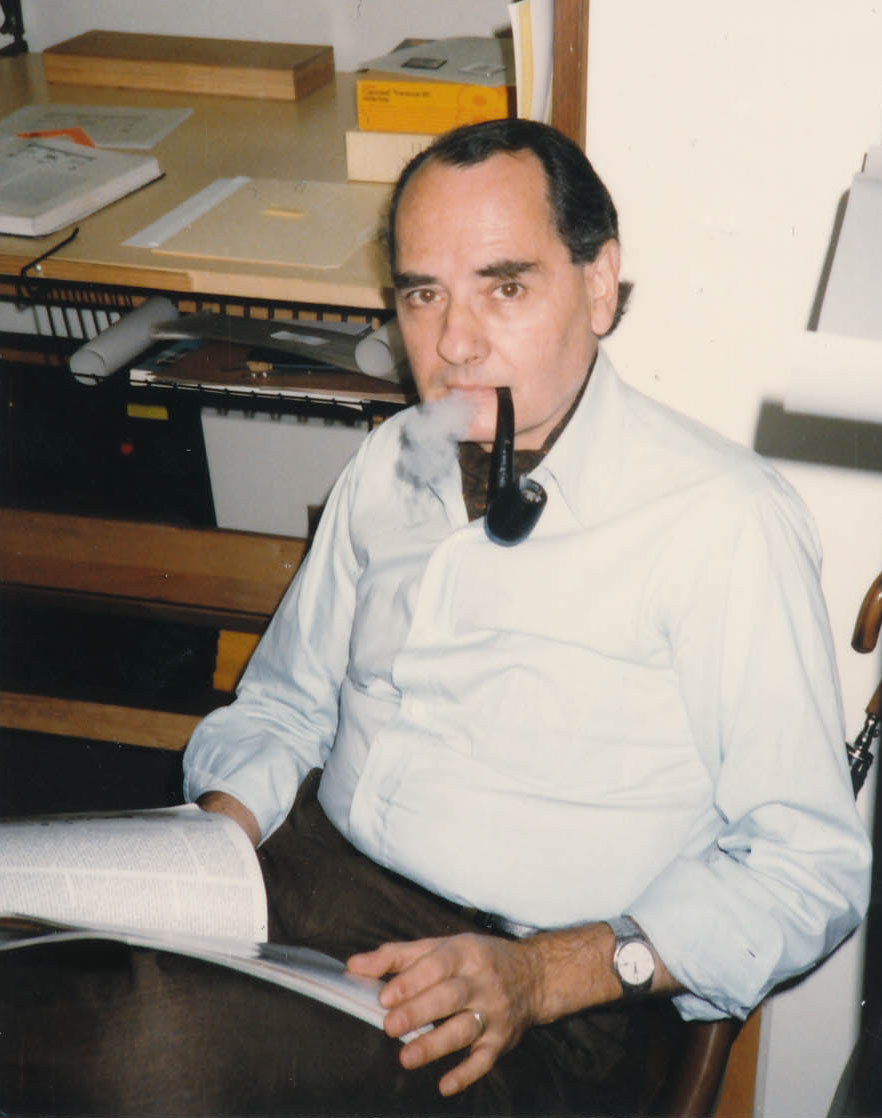
Oscar White Muscarella, Metropolitan Museum of Art, New York, NY, 1986.

Oscar White Muscarella (March 26, 1931 – November 27, 2022) was an American archaeologist and former Senior Research Fellow at the Metropolitan Museum of Art, where he worked for over 40 years before retiring in 2009. He specialized in the art and archaeology of the Ancient Near East, in particular Ancient Persia and Anatolia. Muscarella was an untiring opponent of the looting of ancient sites and earned a reputation as the conscience of the discipline. He received his Ph.D. from the University of Pennsylvania in 1965.

== Early life ==
Muscarella was born on March 26, 1931, in New York, New York (borough of Manhattan), as Oscar White to parents Oscar V. White, an elevator operator, and Anna Falkin. Oscar Sr. and Anna lived in the Bronx and were very poor. In 1936, Anna left Oscar White and abandoned Oscar Jr. and his brother Bobby to live with Salvatore “Sam” Muscarella, whom she later married in 1939. After living in an orphanage for a year, Oscar Jr. and Bobby went to live in Manhattan with Anna and Sam in 1937.

While living in Manhattan, Muscarella joined the Gramercy Boy's Club, and it was in the club’s library that he began to read voraciously. In junior high school, he was a good student, skipping a semester, despite working many outside jobs. His teachers there encouraged him to take the tests to qualify for the elite Stuyvesant High School, where he was accepted. At Stuyvesant he joined the Archaeology Club. A Miss Jones, the Club's librarian (and according to Muscarella, "my first and best librarian") was one of several people to whom he dedicated his 2000 book, The Lie Became Great: The Forgery of Ancient Near Eastern Cultures. He began college at New York University, but transferred in his second year to the City College of New York, working during the day. After six years in the Evening Session, he graduated in 1955 with a degree in History.

== Career ==
In the summer of 1953, Muscarella went on his first excavation at Mesa Verde, a Pueblo Indian site in Colorado, which he followed with work on another excavation at Swan Creek, South Dakota. While at Swan Creek, he received a letter of acceptance from the University of Pennsylvania for graduate study in the Department of Classical Archaeology, and he enrolled. He joined the University of Pennsylvania team at the site of Gordion, Turkey, in 1957, the year he married Grace Freed, a fellow graduate student (in Latin) who later became an archaeological illustrator. In 1958-1959, he was a Fulbright Scholar at the American School of Classical Studies, Athens. Muscarella returned to work at Gordion in 1959 and 1963, and excavated in Iran at Hasanlu in 1960, 1962, and 1964; at Agrab Tepe in 1964; and at Ziwiye in 1964. In 1964 he joined the Department of Ancient Near Eastern Art at the Metropolitan Museum of Art. He received a Ph.D. from the University of Pennsylvania in 1965, writing his dissertation on Phrygian fibulae from Gordion.

At the Metropolitan Museum, Muscarella was Assistant Curator (1964-1969), Associate Curator (1969-1978), and then Senior Research Fellow, retiring in 2009. He continued to work at Hasanlu, as well as other Iranian sites including Dinkha Tepe, Nush-i Jan, and Sé Girdan; he also discovered what he believed to be the important Urartian city of Qalatgah. He was appointed acting head of the department in late 1970 and early 1971, outspoken about the museum’s acquisitions policies with respect to antiquities in light of the recent UNESCO convention, which opened for signature in November 1970. On August 30, 1972, he received his first notice of termination from the museum. This began a years-long legal battle between Muscarella and The Met concerning his wrongful termination, which was eventually resolved with his full reinstatement as Senior Research Fellow in 1978.

== Death ==
Muscarella died on November 27, 2022, at his home in Philadelphia from complications of lymphoma, vascular disease, and COVID-19. He was 91.

== Fight against the antiquities trade ==
"Collecting ancient artifacts — antiquities — is inherently immoral and unethical."

Muscarella saw the collecting of illegal antiquities by individuals and institutions as harmful to the discipline of archaeology. It is now widely recognized that the illegal antiquities trade increases the value of and demand for important artifacts, which creates incentives for the plunder of sites and encourages the production of forgeries. Since looters do not document their digging, as occurs with scientific excavation, their activities end up destroying the archaeological context of the artifacts they uncover. Large parts of cultural history, it is claimed, have been destroyed in this manner. According to Muscarella, museums have been complicit in "bazaar archeology,” and have fabricated proveniences for objects that have been illegally excavated or forged. He alleged that curators are often hesitant to address awkward questions about objects in their collections that have been acquired by purchase, donation, or loan for the exhibition.

The problems are outlined in Muscarella’s 1977 article on the Ziwiye hoard, "'Ziwiye’ and Ziwiye: The Forgery of a Provenience,” where he points out that none of the items were excavated under archaeological conditions, but appeared on the art market and passed through the hands of dealers. He concludes that "there are no objective sources of information that any of the attributed objects actually were found at Ziwiye, although it is probable that some were," and that “the objects have no historical and archaeological value as a group."

== Forgeries ==
Muscarella gained some notoriety in his attempts to unmask certain important artifacts as forgeries, including some in the collection of the Metropolitan Museum of Art. His book ‘‘The Lie Became Great. The Forgery of Ancient Near Eastern Cultures’’ (2000) includes a long catalogue of specific objects in museums, private collections, and the art market that he claimed are modern forgeries. He even assessed whole categories of objects to be forgeries. The book was well-received by reviewers in academic journals, several of whom concluded that it should be "required" or "compulsory" reading for those in the field.

In 2003, he was reported in The Times of London, in a story by Peter Watson, to have "labelled as mostly fake" the Oxus Treasure in the British Museum. As a result, he was attacked in a letter to The Times by then Director of the Metropolitan Museum of Art, Philippe de Montebello, who said that Muscarella, as a long-standing critic of museums' tolerance and even encouragement of the trade in illegal antiquities, had only remained at the museum because of the "exigencies of academic tenure.” De Montebello was himself criticized for suppressing debate. In an article on the Oxus Treasure published in 2003, Muscarella attacked the assumed unity of the treasure and the narratives of its provenience, and questioned the authenticity of some of the votive plaques.

== Select publications ==
- Archaeology, Artifacts, and Antiquities of the Ancient Near East: Sites, Cultures, and Proveniences. Leiden: Brill, 2013;ISBN 9004236694
- "Bronzes of Luristan", Encyclopedia Iranica. 2004 (iranicaonline.org)
- "Jiroft and 'Jiroft-Aratta'", Review of Jiroft: The Earliest Oriental Civilization, by Yousef Majidzadeh. Bulletin of the Asia Institute 15 (2001): pp. 173–198.
- The Lie Became Great: The Forgery of Ancient Near Eastern Cultures. Groningen: Styx, 2000; ISBN 90-5693-041-9
- Bronze and Iron: Ancient Near Eastern Artifacts in the Metropolitan Museum of Art. New York: Metropolitan Museum of Art, 1988; ISBN 0-87099-525-1
- ed. "Introduction." Source: Notes in the History of Art 7, nos. 3/4 (1988). Special issue: Phrygian Art and Archaeology: pp. 2–4.
- "The Background to the Luristan Bronzes", Bronzeworking Centres of Western Asia C. 1000-539 B.C. edited by John Curtis, pp. 33–44. London: Kegan Paul, International, 1988.
- ed. Ladders to Heaven: Art Treasures from Lands of the Bible. Exh. Cat. Toronto: McLelland and Stuart, 1981.
- "Surkh Dum at The Metropolitan Museum of Art: A Mini-Report", Journal of Field Archaeology 8, no. 3 (1981): pp. 327–359
- The Catalogue of Ivories from Hasanlu, Iran. Philadelphia: University Museum, University of Pennsylvania, 1980.
- "Unexcavated Objects and Ancient Near Eastern Art: Addenda" (edited by G. Buccellati). Occasional Papers on the Near East 1, no. 1 (1979): pp. 2–14 (ISBN 0-89003-043-X)
- "'Ziwiye' and Ziwiye: The Forgery of Provenience." Journal of Field Archaeology 4 (1979): pp. 197–219.
- "Urartian Bells and Samos", Journal of the Ancient Near Eastern Society 10 (1978): pp. 61–72.
- "The Archaeological Evidence for Relations between Greece and Iran in the First Millennium B.C." Journal of the Ancient Near Eastern Society 9, no. 1 (1977): pp. 31–57.
- "Unexcavated Objects and Ancient Near Eastern Art", Mountains and Lowlands: Essays in the Archaeology of Greater Mesopotamia edited by Louis D. Levine and T. Cuyler Young, Jr., 153-207. Malibu: Undena Publications, 1977.
- "The Tumuli at Sé Girdan: Second Report", Metropolitan Museum Journal 4 (1971): pp. 5–28
- ed. Ancient Art: The Norbert Schimmel Collection. Mainz: Verlag Philipp Von Zabern, 1974.
- Phrygian Fibulae from Gordion. London: Quaritch, 1967.

== Interviews ==
- Suzan Mazur: "Antiquities Whistleblower Oscar White Muscarella. The Whistleblower & The Politics of The Met's Euphronios Purchase: A talk With Oscar White Muscarella", Scoop, December 25, 2005.
- Stefan Koldehoff: "Museums destroy the history of our earth", Welt am Sonntag, January 29, 2006 (in German).

== Necrology ==
- "Oscar White Muscarella, Museum 'Voice of Conscience' Dies at 91", The New York Times, December 22, 2022.
- "Oscar White Muscarella (1931-2022)", academia.edu. Fall 2022.
- "Oscar White Muscarella, Archaeologist Who Exposed Looted Artifacts and Fakes, Dies at 91", The Washington Post, December 29, 2022.
- Oscar White obituary, legacy.com. Accessed March 11, 2024.
