= Huili Temple =

Buddhist Temple in Zhejiang, China

- 惠力寺
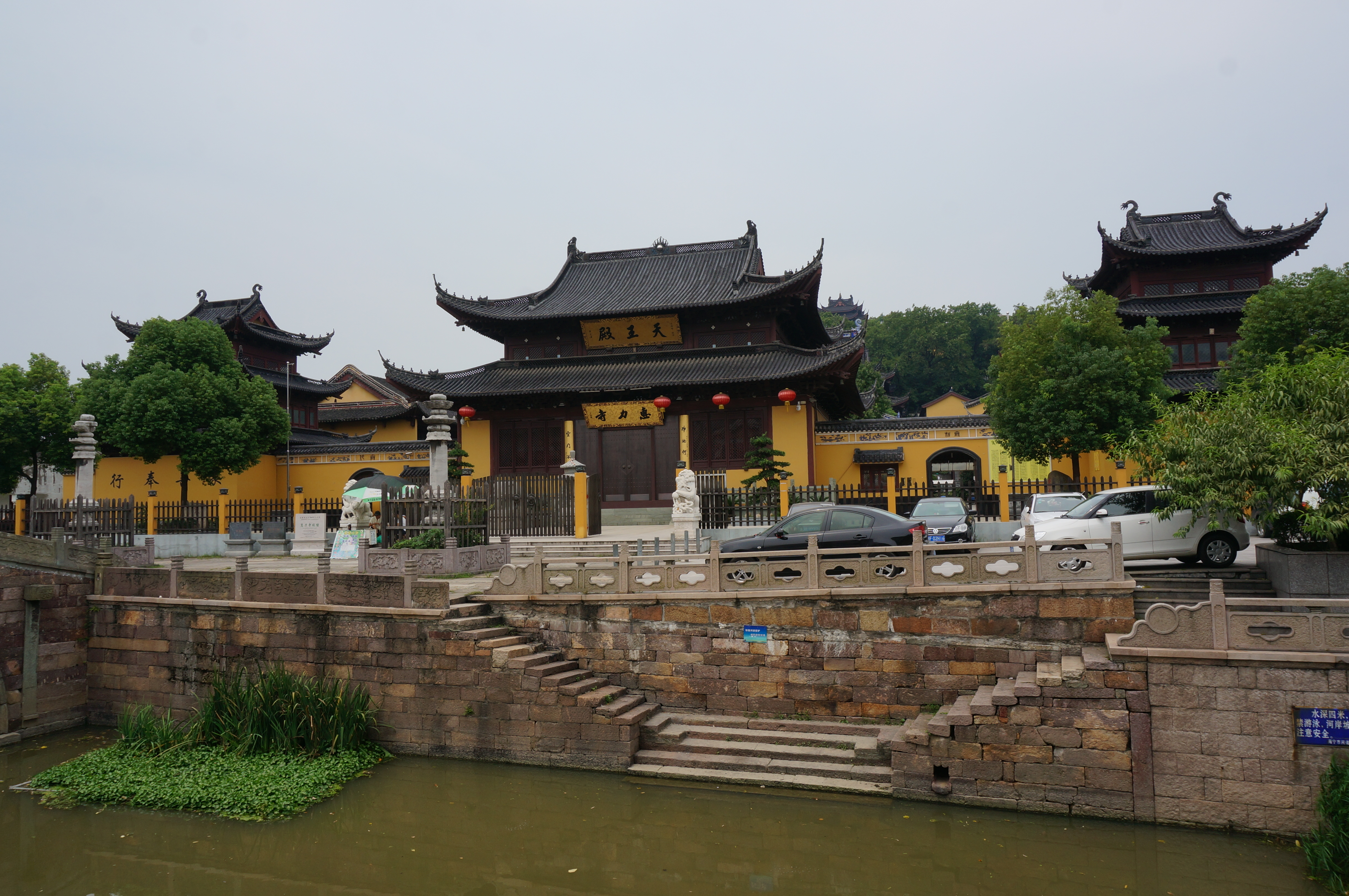
- The Hall of Four Heavenly Kings at Huili Temple.

- Location within Zhejiang

Religion
- Affiliation: Buddhism
- Sect: Chan Buddhism

Location
- Location: Xishan Park, Jiashi Subdistrict, Haining, Zhejiang
- Country: China
- Interactive map of Huili Temple
- Coordinates: 30°32′09″N 120°42′00″E

Architecture
- Style: Chinese architecture
- Founder: Zhang Yanguang
- Established: 373–375

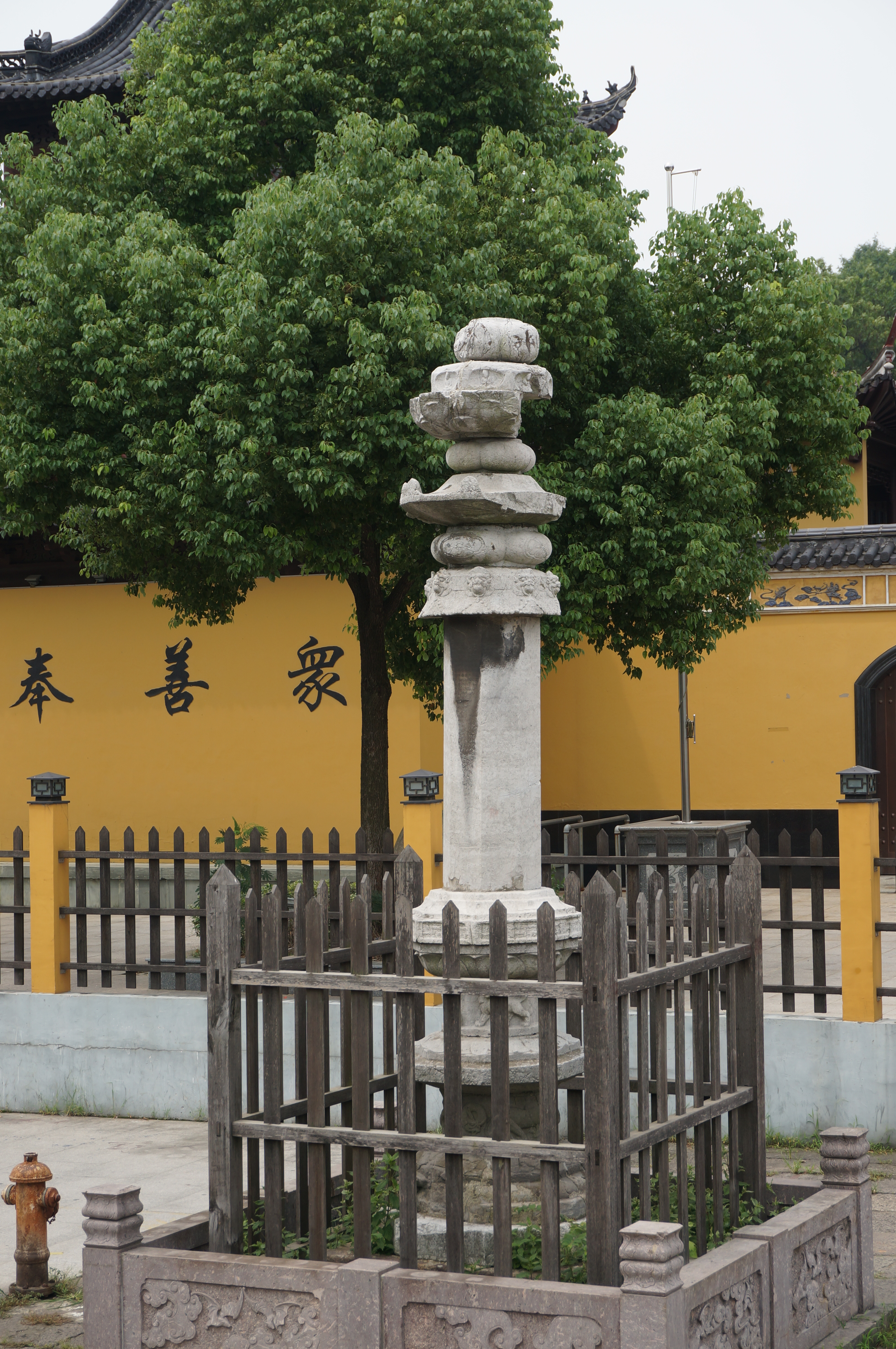
The west Buddhist stone pillar.

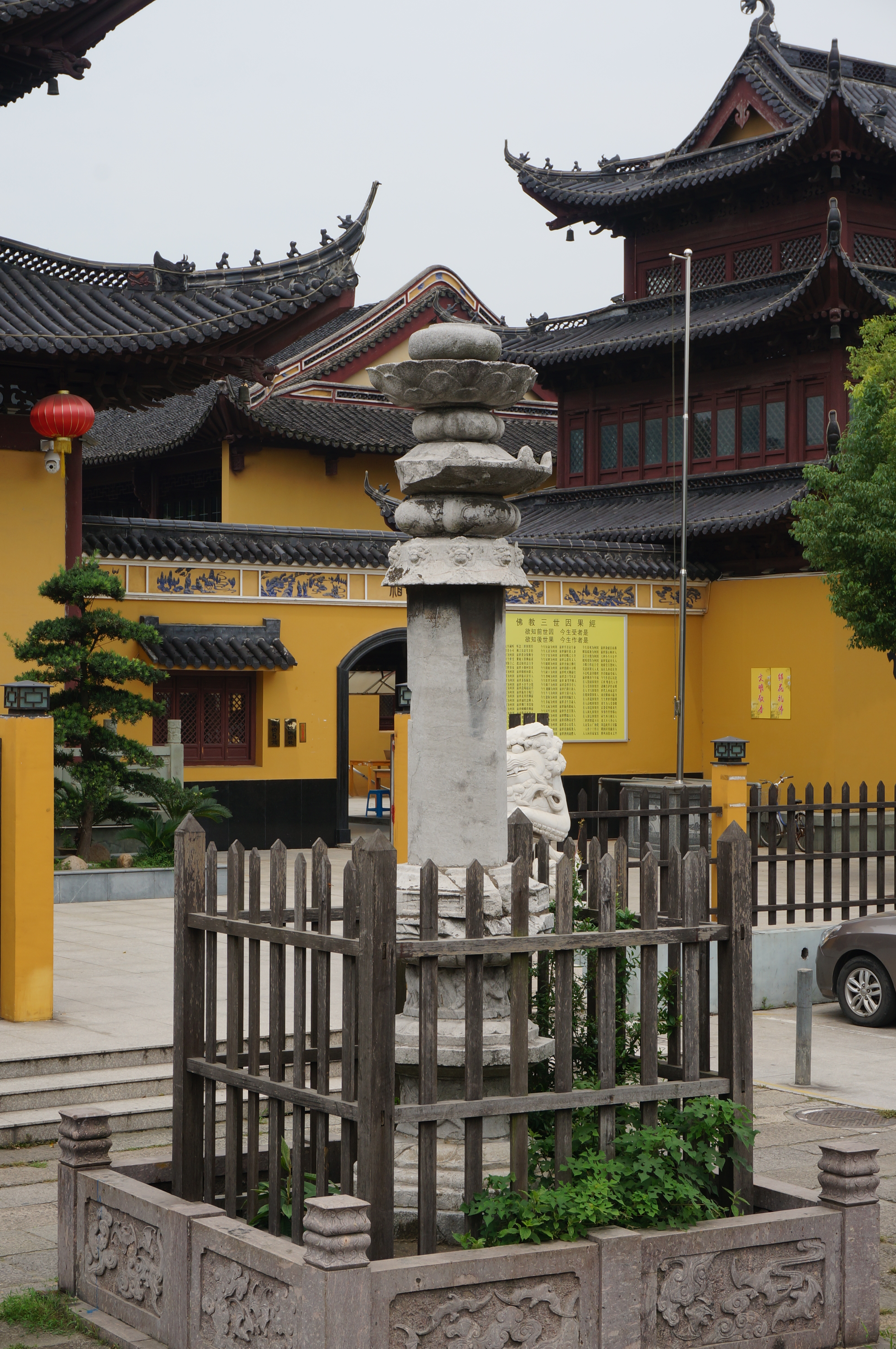
The east Buddhist stone pillar.

Huili Temple (Chinese: 惠力寺; pinyin: Huìlì Sì) is a Buddhist temple located in Xishan Park, Jiashi Subdistrict, Haining, Zhejiang, China.

== History ==
The temple traces its origins to the former Zhiyuan Temple (志愿寺), founded by an official Zhang Yanguang (张延光) between 373 and 375, during the Eastern Jin dynasty (317–420), and would later become Huili Temple in 1009, in the Song dynasty (960–1279).

== Architecture ==
The Mahavira Hall was rebuilt in 1922. It is five rooms wide with double-eave gable and hip roofs.

The temple has two Buddhist stone pillars, which were built in 874, in the Tang dynasty (618–907). In May 2013, they were added to the seventh batch of "List of Major National Historical and Cultural Sites in Zhejiang" by the State Council of China. They have an octagonal shape and are roughly 5-metre (16 ft) high. The base are shaped as sumeru pedestals and are decorated with relief carvings of the Buddha, lotus petals, and other designs. The bodies are carved with Buddhist sutra Uṣṇīṣa Vijaya Dhāraṇī Sūtra.

== Neighbouring area ==
- Ziwei Bridge
