= Ziwei Bridge =

Ziwei Bridge 紫薇桥
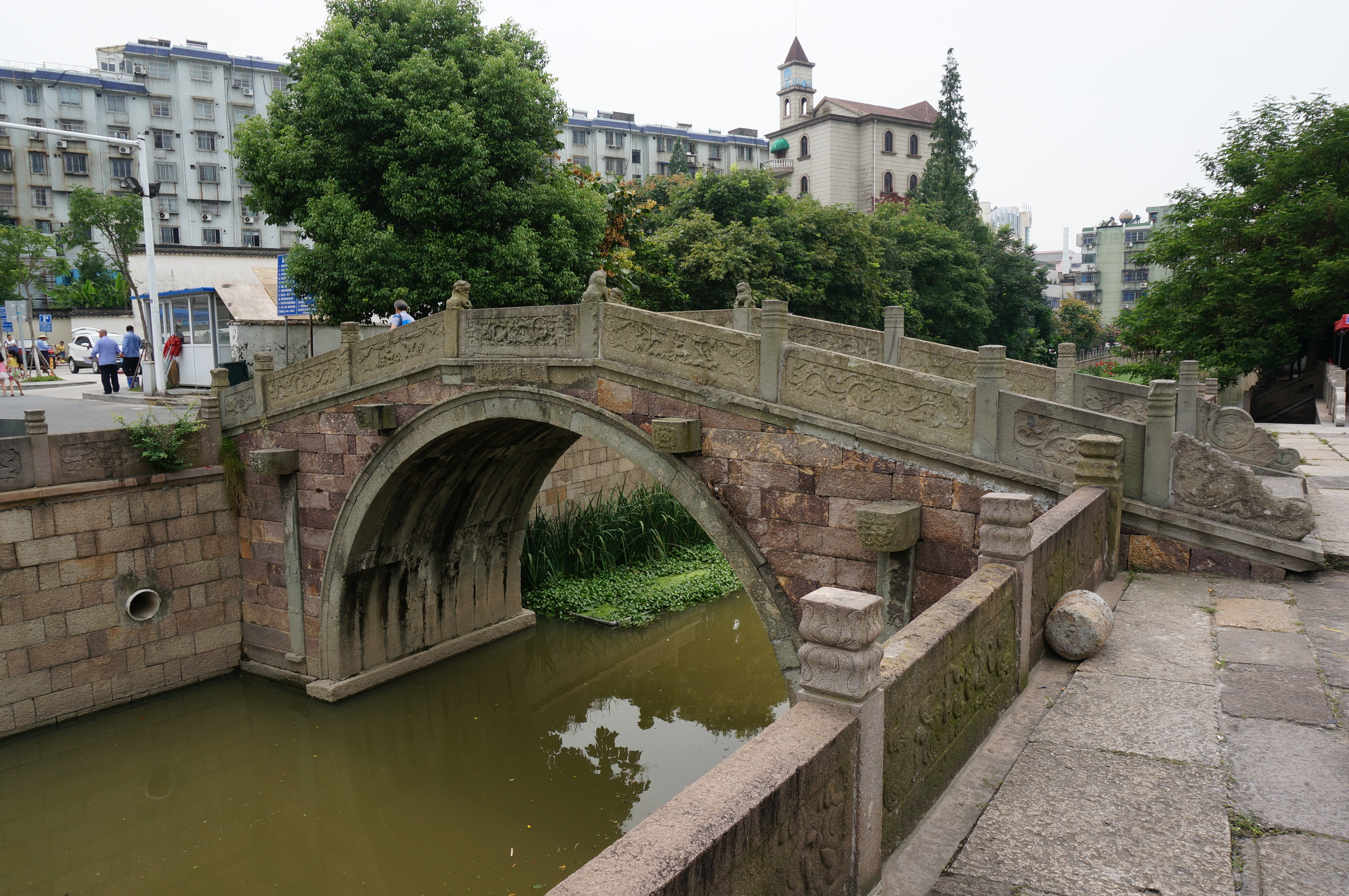
- Ziwei Bridge in August 2014
- Coordinates: 30°32′08″N 120°41′58″E
- Carries: Pedestrians
- Crosses: Cangji River
- Locale: Xiashi Subdistrict, Haining, Zhejiang, China

Characteristics
- Design: Arch bridge
- Material: Stone
- Total length: 10 metres (33 ft)
- Width: 3 metres (9.8 ft)
- Longest span: 6 metres (20 ft)

History
- Construction end: 1303
- Rebuilt: 2002

The Ziwei Bridge (simplified Chinese: 紫薇桥 or 紫微桥; traditional Chinese: 紫薇橋 or 紫微橋; pinyin: Zǐwēi Qiáo) is a historic stone arch bridge over the Cangji River (仓基河) in Xiashi Subdistrict, Haining, Zhejiang, China.

== History ==
The temple was originally built in 1303 during emperor Temür Khan's reign during the Yuan dynasty (1271–1368), and underwent three renovations, respectively in 1730 and 1796 of the Qing dynasty (1644–1911) and in 2002. The banknote issued by the Farmers Bank of China in the Republic of China used it as the front design. In October 1984, it has been designated as a municipal-level cultural heritage site by the Government of Haining.

== Neighbouring area ==
- Huili Temple
