= Ziwiyeh Castle =

Archaeological site in Iran

The castle of Ziwiyeh
- Kurdish: Qelay Zewiye, Persian: قلعه زیویه
- Saqqez, Kurdistan province, Iran
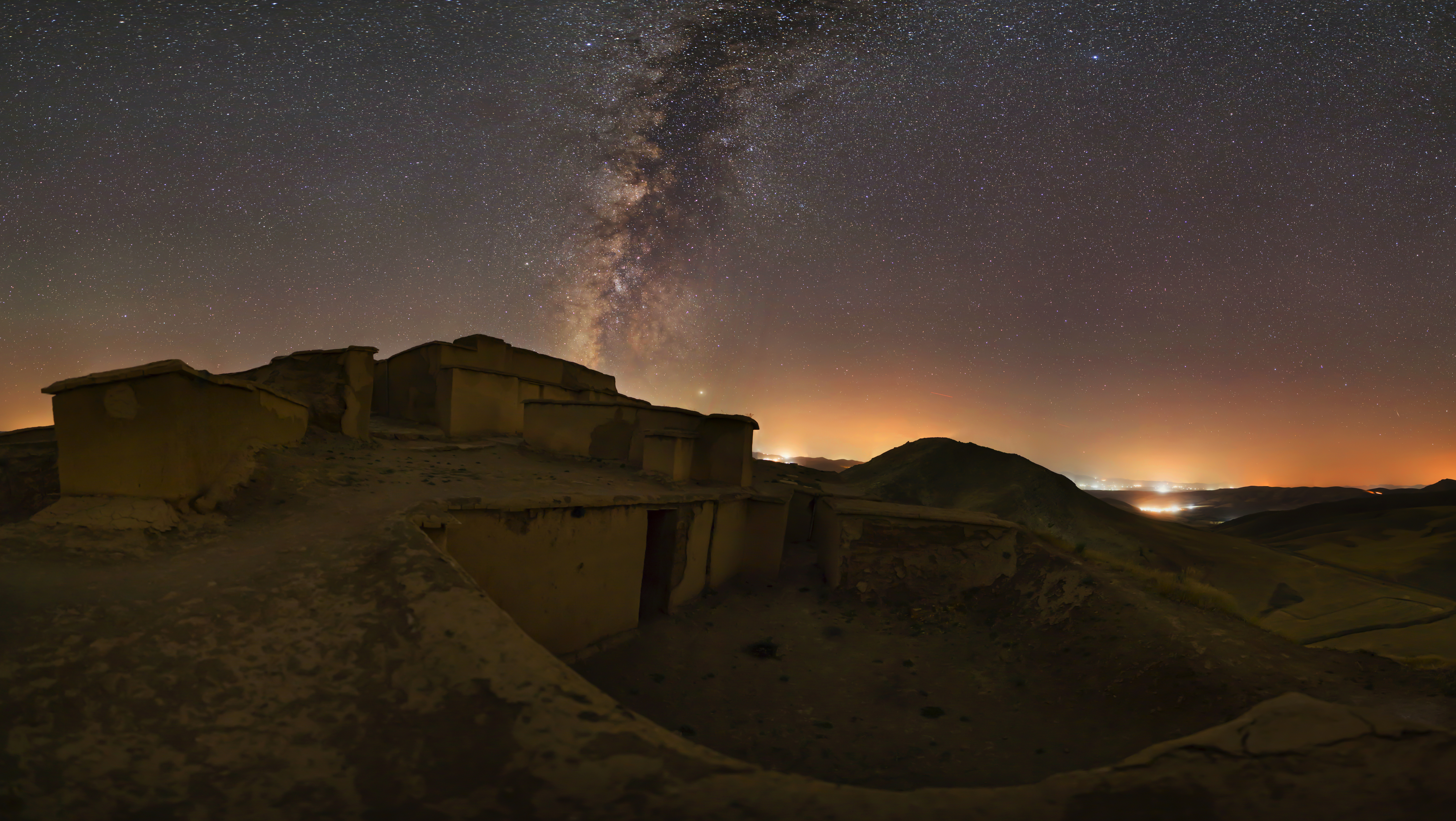
- The castle of Zewiyeh on a hill at night

Site information
- Type: Citadel
- Controlled by: Iran
- Open to the public: Yes
- Condition: Partially ruined

Location
- Coordinates: 36.154°N 46.411°E

Site history
- Battles/wars: Siege by the Scythians (700 BC)

The castle of Ziwiyeh or Ziwiyeh Castle (Persian: قلعه زیویه) is an ancient building situated on the top of a mount above the wide Ziwiyeh Cave in Saqqez, Iran. Ziwiye tepe or castle is located 50 kilometers to Saqqez and the area now have been somewhat rebuilt by Iranian Cultural Heritage Organization. It is located at an altitude of 1,835 metres (6,020 ft) above sea level in Kurdistan province of Iran on the south of Lake Urmia. Artefacts found there belong to the 9th century BC (belonging to the Medes era) and have been kept in some museums. A large golden necklace with some mythical animals engraved on it is one of the most famous things found in the area.

== History ==
This castle was the residence of the Medes and Scythians and was considered their capital and its history dates back to the first millennium BC. Also before the Medes and Scythians, this castle was the capital of the Mannaeans who were attacked by the Assyrians.

== Structure of the castle ==
The building of this castle or fortress was three-story with 21 stone stairs. The foundation of stairs and columns was of the stone and walls were built of adobe. The first story a part of which has been still remained had a religious function and it is estimated to be a temple. Being located in the same level as the hillside made it easily accessible for people. The second floor was built on a stone triangular bench due to the slope and it was residential. Interconnected painted rooms in blue, cream, black and brick colors differentiated it from other parts. The archery and bronze arrow discovered in this floor lead to the possibility of the second floor to be the residence of military force and army ammunition.

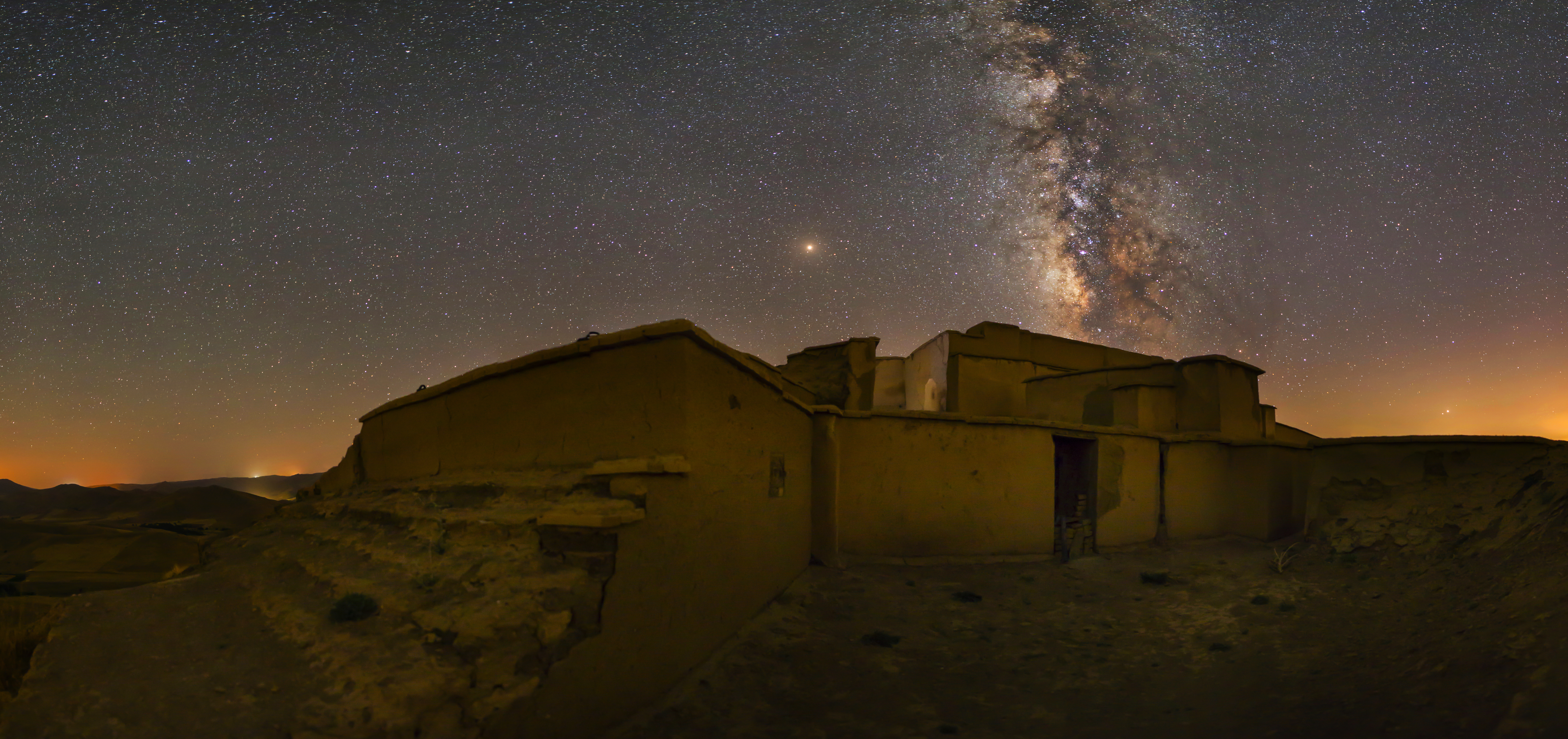
The Castle at night

The third floor that is also called ruler residence has a barn that means it had been a secure place for the days of war and siege. This floor has wide rooms with large doors and windows and 12 stone capitals and some stone and wooden columns; Andre Godard has spoken about the table and chairs with bronze decorations in this hall. The ground of this building paved with brick or tiles in some parts. there are two north and south gates in this castle and the gate that is placed in side of the mountain peak has beautiful tile decorations. The castle had water piping that was supplied from the springs in the neighboring mountains.

== Ziwiye Treasure ==
Ziviyeh treasure was found by archaeologists at the site of Ziwiye Castle at the beginning of the 20th century. This treasure was transferred to the world's major museums.

== See also ==
- Ziwiye hoard
- Ziviyeh District
