= Civitate =

Civitate may refer to:

- Poggio Civitate, hill in the commune of Murlo, Siena, Italy
- San Paolo di Civitate, a town and comune in the province of Foggia in the Apulia region of southeast Italy
- Teanum Apulum, archaeological site near San Paolo di Civitate
  - Battle of Civitate, 1053
