= Sylvia Salazar Simpson =

Sylvia Veneranda Salazar
- Born: 1939 (age 86–87); Santa Fe, New Mexico
- Education: Institute of Cardiology, Otis Art Institute (1966-1968); California Institute of the Arts (1970–1971)
- Known for: Photography, Installation, Performative, Books, Food/Organic Material
- Spouse: Thomas Jeremy Simpson
- Website: https://www.sylviasalazarsimpson.com/

Sylvia Salazar Simpson (born 1939) is an installation and book artist as well as a photographer. Born in Santa Fe, New Mexico, she was raised in Mexico City, Mexico. In the mid-1960s, upon her arrival to Los Angeles, she began her trajectory toward the arts. Her works deal with social commentary on women and the female body, as well as the use of organic and perishable items.

== Personal life ==
Salazar Simpson was born to Veneranda Emanuela Gutierrez. She married Thomas Jeremy Simpson, a farm broker, in 1965. She is also a mother of two daughters.

Salazar Simpson also mentions that she has manic depressive disorder.

== Education ==
Salazar Simpson first started off her educational career at the Instituto Nacional de Cardiología in Mexico City in nursing but due to her naturalization being in the US, she did not receive a degree. In the 1960s, after her return to Los Angeles she began studying at Otis College of Art and Design from 1966 to 1968. She also studied at California Art Institute from 1970 to 1971, where she studied under Allan Kaprow, a life-long friend and mentor.

== Exhibitions ==
- Southern California Small Images Show, Los Angeles State College, (1974).
- L.A. Woman/Narrations, Mandeville Art Gallery, University of California, San Diego (October 6, 1978 – October 29, 1978)
- LAMEXOD, Santa Barbara Contemporary Arts Forum, California, (1983).
- Southern California Assemblage: Past and Present, Santa Barbara Contemporary Arts Forum, California, (1986).
- Absolutamente Romántico II, California State University, Bakersfield, (1990).
- From Bonnard to Baselitz: A Decade of Acquisitions by the Prints Collection 1978–1988, Bibliothèque Nationale, Paris, France (1992).
- Radical Women: Latin American Art, 1960-1975, Hammer Museum, Los Angeles (Sep 15, 2017 - Dec 31, 2017)
- Radical Women. Latin American Art, 1960–1985, Brooklyn Museum, New York City, New York (April 13, 2018 – July 22, 2018)
- Mulheres radicais: arte latino-americana 1960–1985, Pinacoteca do Estado do São Paulo, São Paulo, São Paulo, Brasil (18 Aug 2018 – 19 Nov 2018)

=== Woman's Building ===
Women and the Printing Arts is a catalog that carries different mediums in the form of books, postcards, and posters all created through printing technology. The work was exhibited during January 11 – February 1, 1975, at the Woman's Building in Los Angeles. Sylvia Salazar Simpson shows up within the catalog as one of those works.

== Works ==
=== Books ===
- Sylvia Salazar Simpson (1970) – photographs of the artist with different items wrapped in her hair.
- Eggs Verbal A/Z (1973) - photo book of cracked eggs corresponding in some way with each letter of the alphabet.
- Imitations (1977) - a photo book of different types of items carved as shoes (high heel) and being worn on the artist's feet.
- Bailando Sentado (1982) – an installation that became a photo book. It was a suite with marshmallows, apples, and hair on the walls and a thousand pounds of walnuts laid out on the floor.
- Blue Sugar Book (1997)- moistened layers of toilet paper seeped in sugar, which she described as a reminder of the lithium she took for her manic depressive disorder.

=== Photography ===
- Antes/Before (Self Portrait) (1981)- self portrait of the artist with worms and flowers wrapped on her head and hair.
- Untitled (1993) - series of pictures, including food materials, as well as more organic materials that were taken before the fires in Malibu.

=== Performances ===
- "A Food Piece", LA Women Narrations (1978) – staged a performance where a man and woman were covered in different type of food materials – such as peanut butter, pomegranate seeds, and fish – and they were to pose as Cervatari sarcophagus. This was mean to be an allegory for marriage that was both sensous and humorous.

=== Installations ===
- California Terrace (1974) - brings in the use of eggs, their yolks reflecting into a mirror from a concrete base.
- Honey's Room (1974) – fishing leader tied diagonally across a room, brushed with a mixture of honey and sugar caramel. This was largely inspired in hopes to attract ants to all the sugar materials, but that did not happen.
- Bailando Sentado (1982) – an installation that became a photo book. It was a suite with marshmallows, apples, and hair on the walls and a thousand pounds of walnuts laid out on the floor.
- Life and Progress (1984–1985) – different types of items (nopales, oranges, clothing, mirrors) tied up on a trees in Los Olivos.
- Tortilla Curtain (1991) – chicken feet covered in glitter dangled from the ceiling. This was meant to express that beauty could be found in ordinary items.
- Altar Box 1 and 2 (1997) – items gathered together after the artist's house burning, creating small altar like displays. The boxes had objects like shoes, food items, and toys. There were 50 of them created.
- Mi Mama Era Preciosa (2017–2018) – an altar created in memory of Salazar Simpson's mother, Veneranda Guiterrez Salazar. There were candles, drying flowers, a picture of her mother, and other natural objects.

=== Paper ===
- Double Duplicity (1973) – a photo of a cargo like outfit on a hanger.
- Shoe Polish (1974) – black and white photographs of a child buttering her shoes with butter.
- El Amor Y Dinero – a painted paper with the stenciled letters of the words "love and money".
- Commemoration of 4th of July - a woman with hot dogs wrapped in her hair, mimicking curling irons.

=== Food material ===
This theme of using food/organic material is consistent in Salazar Simpson's work. At most times, these food materials are at a point of rotting. According to Salazar Simpson, her consistent use of this material was due to food being the most familiar because of her 7 years of marriage. Salazar Simpson shares her choosing in this material because it forces the viewer to smell and smelling fixates most into memory.

Salazar Simpson describes her work as viscous, which was realized after having seen her daughters throwing eggs into the ground, searching for chicks.

== Recognition/awards ==
In 1991, Salazar Simpson was awarded as the winning design for the Venice Art Walk T-shirt.

== Collections ==
- Untitled [19 photos of model wearing headdresses constructed of various food items.] – Arts Library Cage Artists' Books (UCLA)
- Imitations – Arts Library Cage Artists' Books (UCLA)
- Eggs verbal : A/Z – Arts Library Cage Artists' Books (UCLA)
- LA Woman Narrations – UCSD Collection
- Franklin Furnace Archive, New York
- Special Collections, Otis Art Institute, Los Angeles
- Then No One Knows #25, color photograph, Ad&A Museum, UCSB, Gift of Phyllis Plous
