= Sarcophagus of the Spouses =

Etruscan tomb effigy of 530–510 BCE

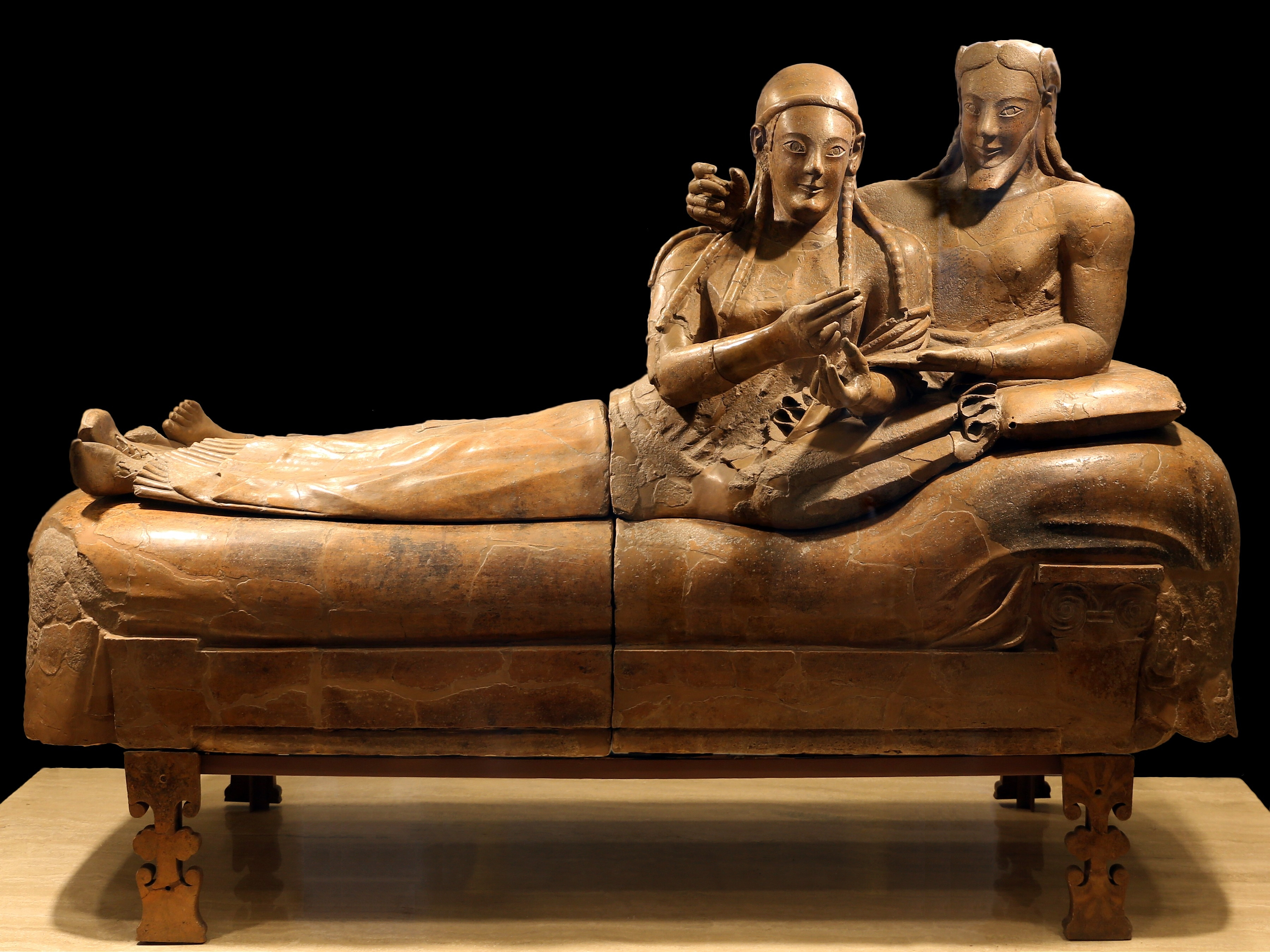
- Year: 530–510 BCE
- Type: Terracotta
- Dimensions: 1.14 m × 1.9 m (3.7 ft × 6.2 ft)
- Location: National Etruscan Museum, Rome

The Sarcophagus of the Spouses (Italian: Sarcofago degli Sposi) is a tomb effigy considered one of the masterpieces of Etruscan art. The Etruscans lived in Italy between two main rivers, the Arno and the Tiber, and were in contact with the Ancient Greeks through trade, mainly during the Orientalizing and Archaic periods. The Etruscans were well known for their terracotta sculptures and funerary art, predominantly sarcophagi and urns. This sarcophagus is a late sixth-century BCE Etruscan anthropoid sarcophagus found at the Banditaccia necropolis in Caere, and is now in the National Etruscan Museum at Villa Giulia, Rome.

It is not to be confused with a similar sarcophagus, also given the same name, in the Louvre. This was very possibly made by the same workshop. There are other examples of reclining couples as Etruscan sarcophagus lids; both the Villa Giulia museum and the Louvre have other examples, smaller and less famous.

== Description ==
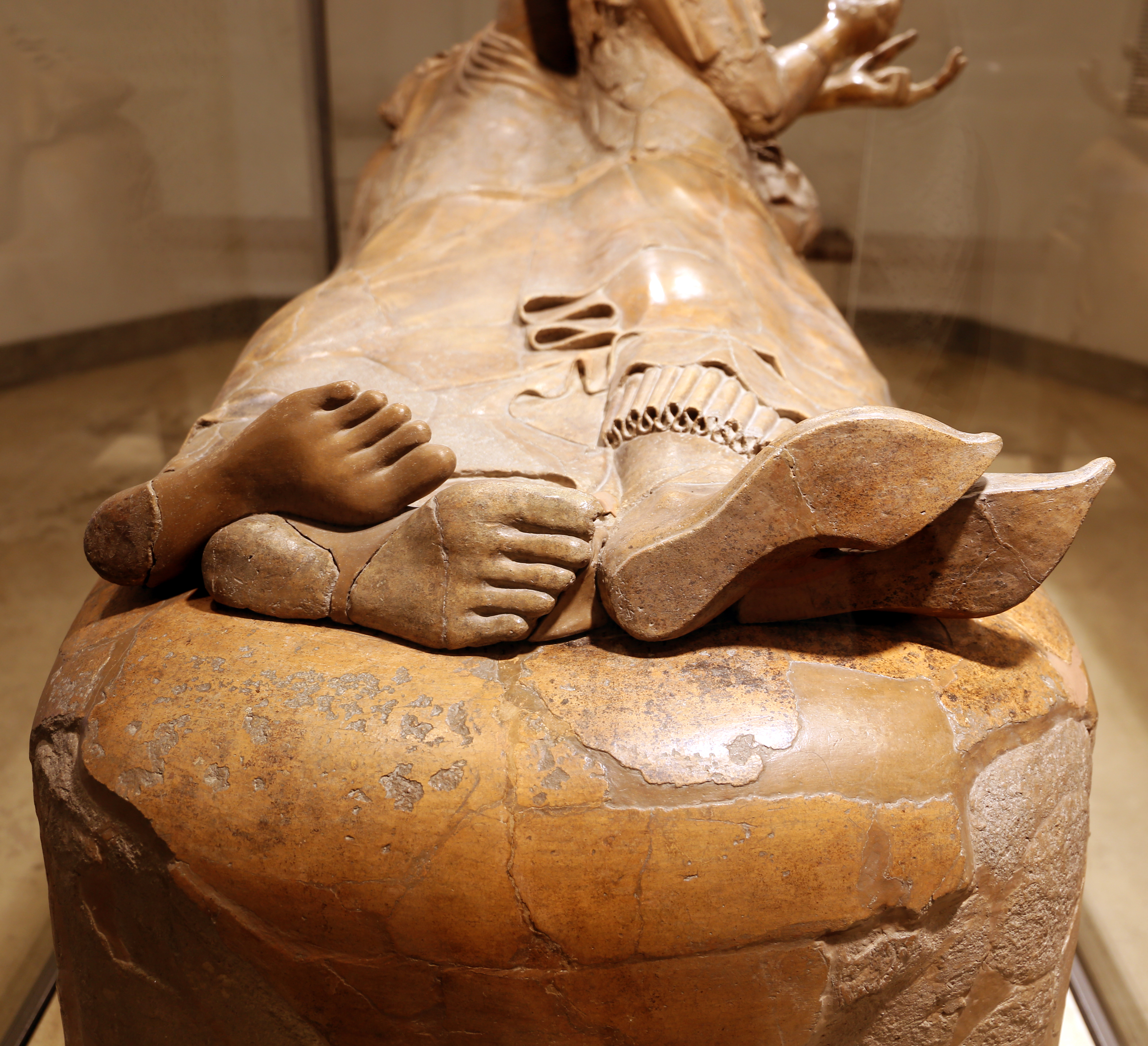
Detail of the feet, Rome

The sarcophagus cover is made out of terracotta and was once brightly painted. It depicts a man and woman lying on a klinē, a dining couch with cushions to help keep the spouses propped up, all of which have been stylized. The body proportions of the man and woman have been elongated as was common in the Archaic period. Their hair has been styled in a plaited fashion, although the woman's braids are hanging over her shoulders while wearing a soft cap, and the man has braids behind that are fanned out over his shoulders and back. The faces of the couple show them smiling, and their eyes are distinctly almond-shaped, giving them a happy look.

There is a line across the middle of the sarcophagus that shows that it was made as separate pieces. The figures' legs and hips have been stylized to fit better as a lid, with the only distinguishing figural features showing up at the end of the lid in the shape of their feet.

The man and woman's feet are distinguished from each other, as the man is shown barefoot and the woman wearing pointed-toed shoes, which is an Etruscan characteristic. However, the marked contrast between the busts in high relief and the very flattened legs is typically Etruscan, as is the interest of the upper half of the figures with their expressive faces and arms.

This sarcophagus was created in four separate pieces that were fired separately and then assembled later on.

== Historical context ==
=== Cremation ===
Etruscan culture had an appreciation for taking care of the remains of their loved ones; this is seen by how many resources were put into creating their tombs and funerary art, so much so that their cemeteries were often called the "cities of the dead" or necropolis. The main funerary practice for the dead was cremation, in which the loved one's ashes and bones were placed into a cinerary urn or ash urn.

The Villanovans, people who were part of the Etruscan culture, created a different type of urn that was biconical. It has two cones connected together made without a potter's wheel, keeping the clay coarse and unrefined. They also made clay huts to contain their remains, which resemble the houses that have been found in an important Etruscan site, Cavalupo. They could place personal items with them such as weapons for men and jewelry for women.

Archeologists have uncovered different types of Etruscan hut urns that have contained both male and female ashes and bone fragments, so it can be presumed that the Sarcophagus of the Spouses would have contained cremated remains.

=== Rituals ===
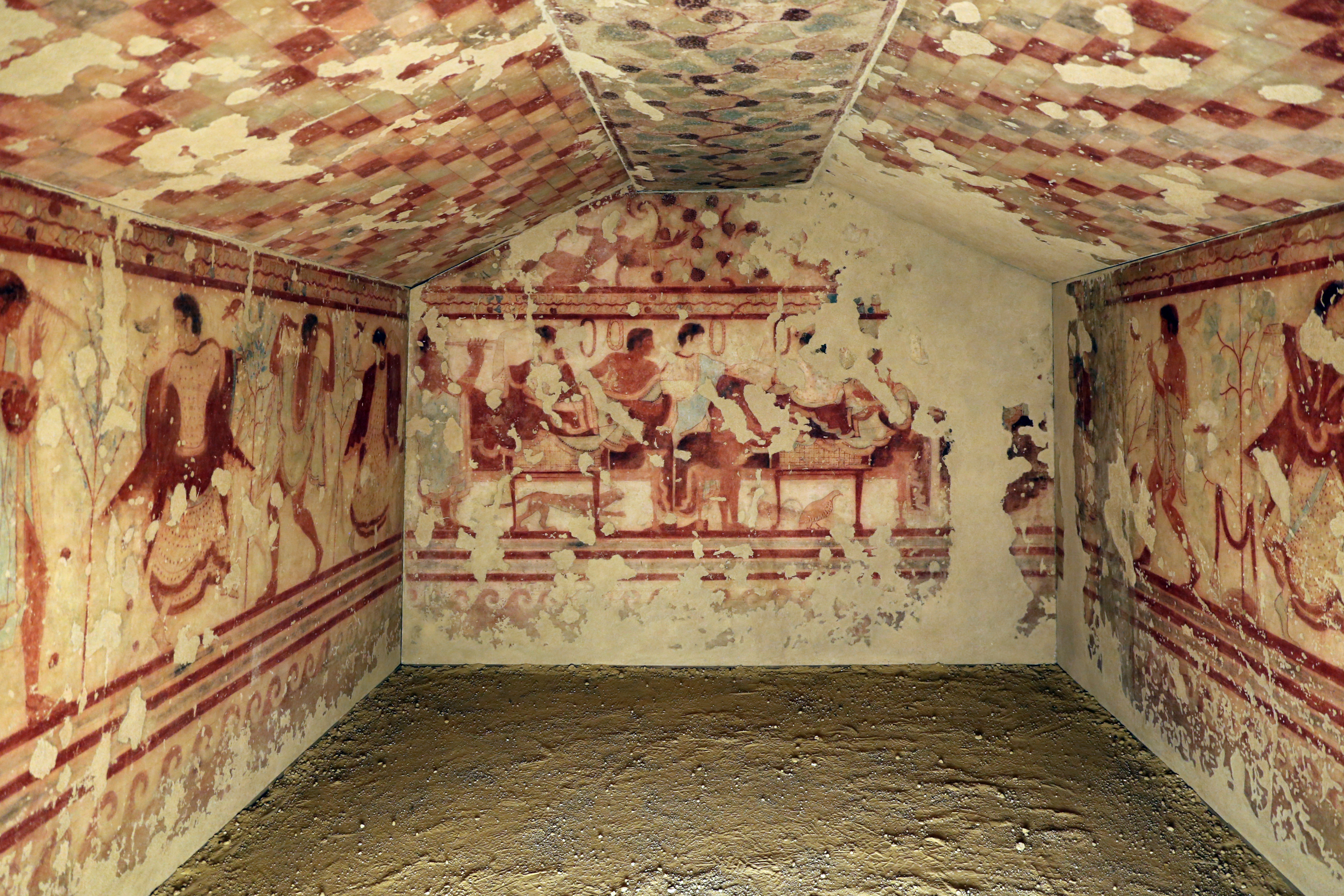
Fresco in the Triclinium Tomb of the Funerary Banquets

The funerary rituals that the Etruscans created ranged from a simple hut and small gathering to those a more elaborate space for loved ones such as a tomb or other funerary art or having mosaics and relief sculptures. One such tomb can be found in the Monterozzi necropolis of Tarquinia, Lazio, which is known for its painted walls that inform us what they did for their funerals and society. This subterranean rock-cut tomb was used for holding the remains of the dead as well as for votive offerings for the dead. There is a fresco on the back wall which, though damaged, shows a banquet dinner party, with people being depicted in similar positions as that seen in the Sarcophagus of the Spouses. There are three pairs of couples shown enjoying a dinner party and lounging on klines. In Etruscan banquets, it was a common practice to have both men and woman, who had equal status in their society, share this event with each other as it is represented here in the fresco; they are side-by-side and shown in the same proportions and in similar poses. Both parties are smiling and expressing affection toward one another. The fresco relief, which has the same setting as the Spouses, can show that they have a positive outlook on sending their loved ones to the afterlife since they are sharing their last meals with their family members for all eternity. This is also shown in the Etruscans' practise of burying parts of the meal with them along with the proper dishes and utensils so they would have those in the afterlife.

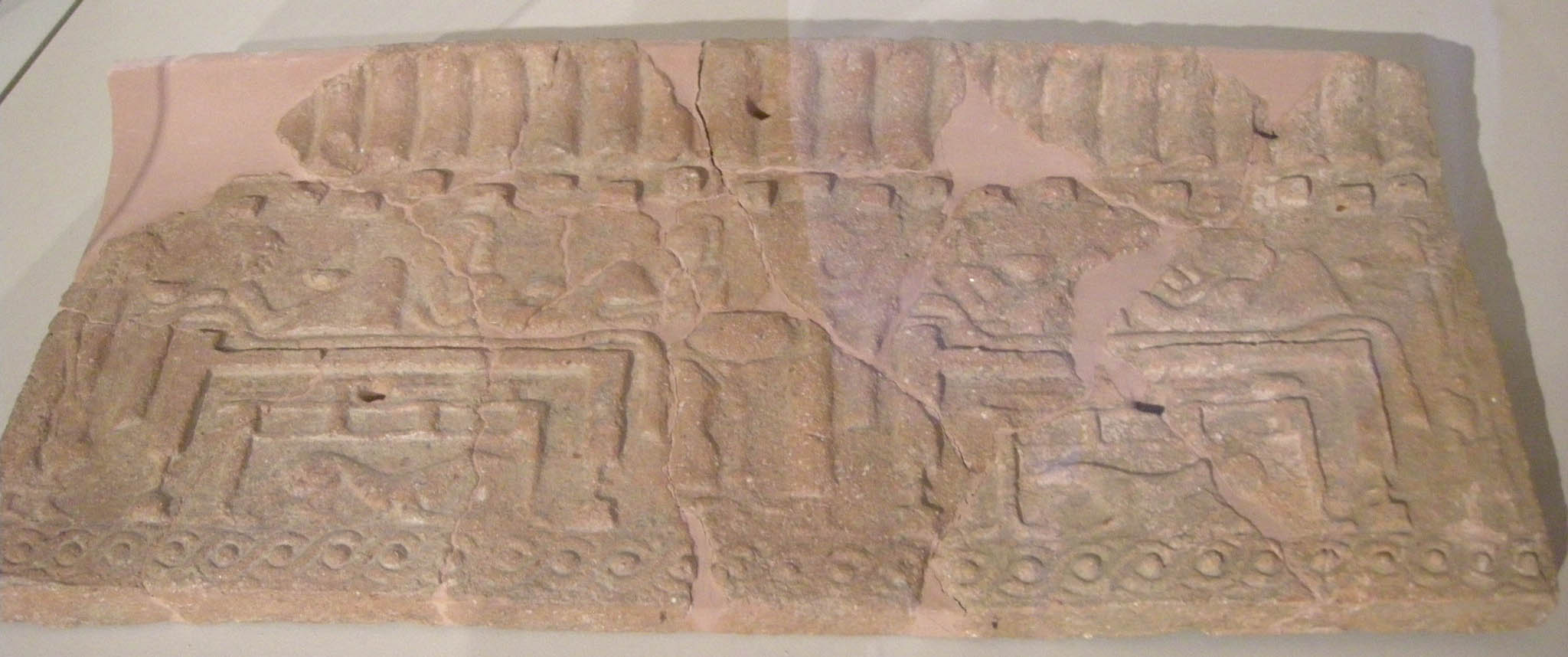
Banquet slab found at Poggio Civitate

The tomb fresco from Monterozzi shows how the couples have bright colorful clothes, which could be compared to the paint that was on the sarcophagus. These bright colors show them as elites. They also have two attendants serving the banqueters, and on the sides of the tomb paintings showcase what entertainment the Etruscans would have participated in; for example, musicians are playing and people dancing. Similar to the Greeks they show what gender is being portrayed by what paint they used for their skin, light colors for females, and dark colors for males. From the fresco of Monterozzi, it can be determined that the Sarcophagus of the Spouses depicts a normal occurrence. There is a Banquet Plaque that was found at Poggio Civitate, Murlo, that also has similar iconography of the banquets that the Etruscans held – another piece that shows these banquets were an important form of ritual for them.

== Family ==
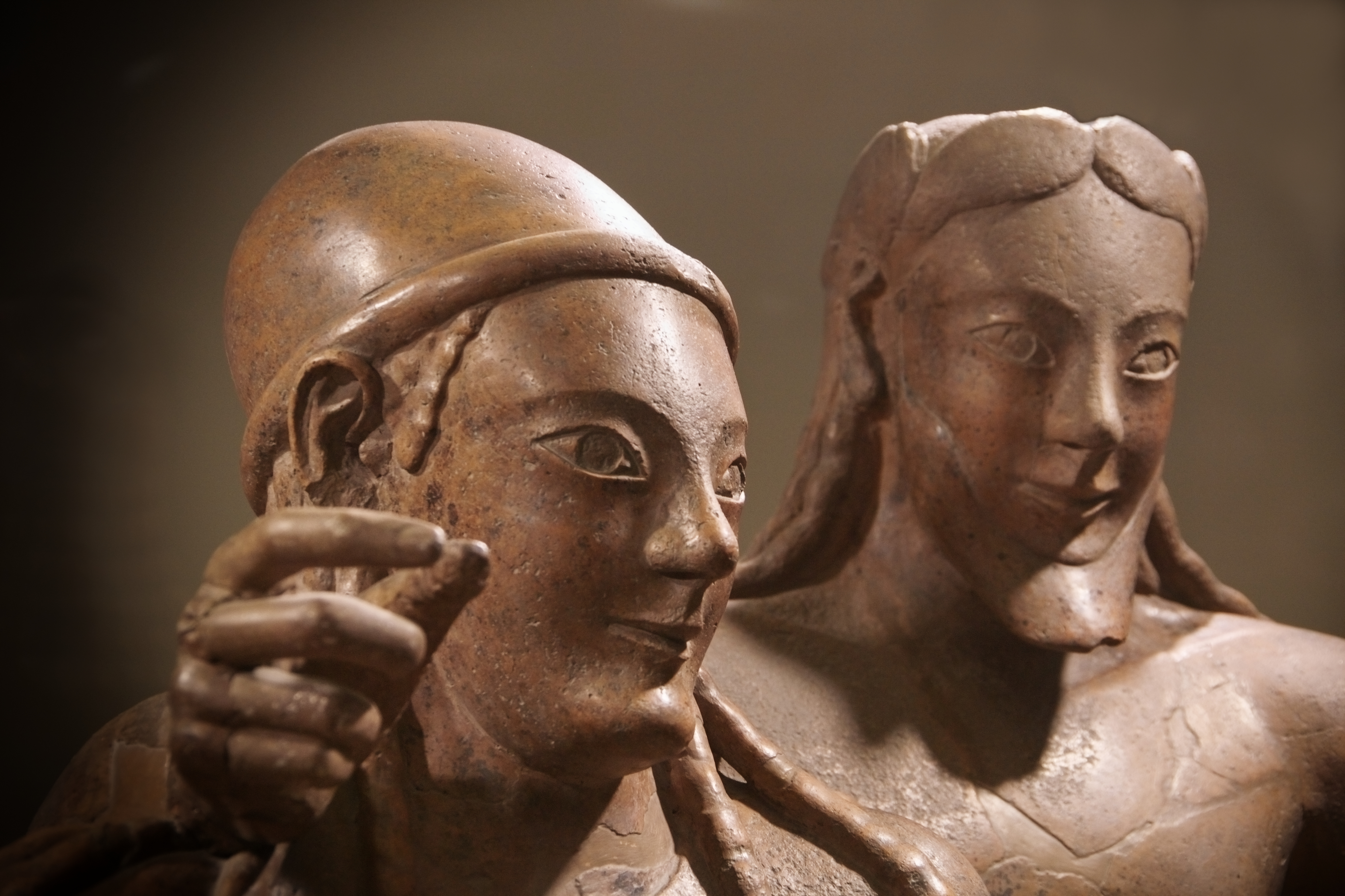
Heads of the couple, Rome

Another aspect that the Etruscans were known for is their family ties. Since they made such elaborate tombs for their deceased loved ones, and the sarcophagus is based on a couple, it can be seen that family ties were important in their society. The use of funerary urns and how they were created, such as the spouses, along with the materials, the scale of their urn or sarcophagus, if they add imagery, or how they create the dynamic of their people can show social ties. There could be inscriptions as well, such as family or clan names, either located on the outside of the tomb or with their belongings. Another family value that has been touched on earlier in the banquets, which can be seen from the fresco and with the addition with the sarcophagus shows an eternal family dinner.

There are other types of sarcophagi that have a family meaning to them such as the rock-carved funerary beds that have been found at Banditaccia, where the Spouses were found. These specific sarcophagi would have identifying features to show who was male and female buried in them. These rock-carved sarcophagi are in the shape of a bed, and if it was placed on the left side of a tomb it was meant for a male and on the right, it was meant for a female. The male sarcophagus was carved to resemble a wooden bed, with the ends laying flat and the legs, if any, were carved in cylinders. That of the females would have the same features as the male, yet they would be enclosed in a house-like structure, with the ends of the bed raised in a triangular shape to resemble roofing. There have also been smaller sarcophagi found near where the women would be buried that have been presumed to be for children. They would indicate the number and gender of people on the outside of the tomb.

=== Etruscan women ===
Limited evidence has been found about what the Etruscans did as a whole but from what has been found from sites dating back to the Orientalizing period, women of higher Etruscan society did have the same status as the men. Seen in burials they have been more lavish, as well with pottery that would have inscriptions of both their individual name (praenomen) and their family name (nomen), although only free women would have a personal name. It has been shown that women of the higher society were literate and that females related to a male by blood ties were respected since they were the ones carrying children through her bloodline.

== Similar sarcophagi ==
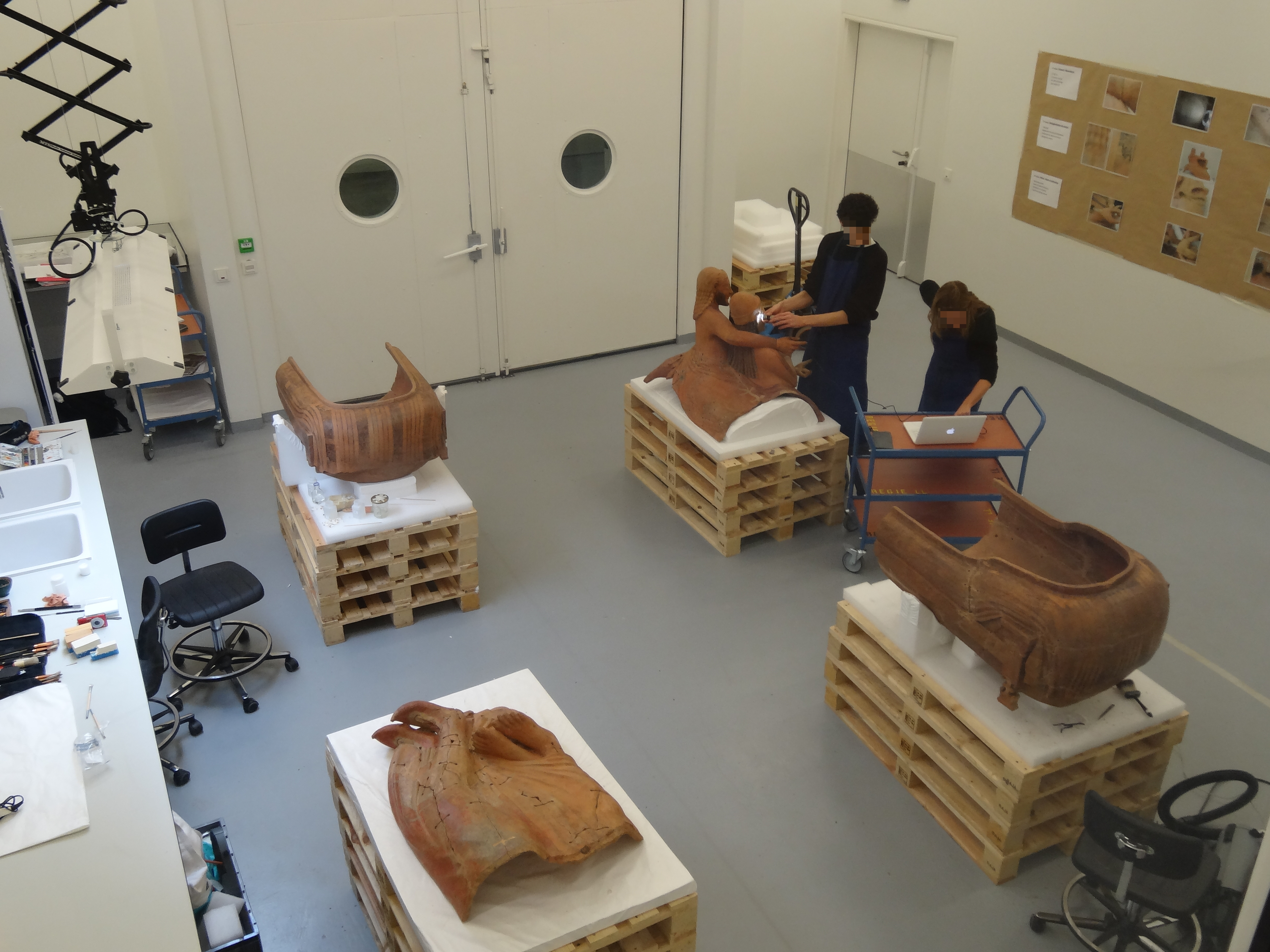
The four separate pieces of the Sarcophagus, Louvre version

A similar sarcophagus from Caere was found at the Banditaccia necropolis. It also is called the Sarcophagus of the Spouses (Sarcophage des Époux) and is in the Louvre in Paris (Cp 5194). This sarcophagus has similarities that can suggest that they were made in the same studio, from the size, shape, and function of the sarcophagi. Here the male is now missing a hand.

A second similar sarcophagus that could have been from the same studio was found in Caere. The urn of Monte Abatone, which is smaller than the other two, is made of terracotta and is in a similar style of laying on a couch or kline. It differs from the other two in that it is a single figure of a woman, as she poses in a way that depicts her pouring a liquid, possibly oil or perfume, in her hand. This is now in the National Etruscan Museum of Villa Giulia, Rome, and in 2021 this urn was being restored by the Museums Restoration Service and the DE.CO.RE Company.

Another is a smaller version of the composition of the Sarcophagus of the Spouses. This urn also has a couple, the bare-chested man embracing the clothed woman, leaning up against pillows, laying on a kline with their legs covered up and their feet slightly sticking out. However, this man does not have a beard.

Louvre example

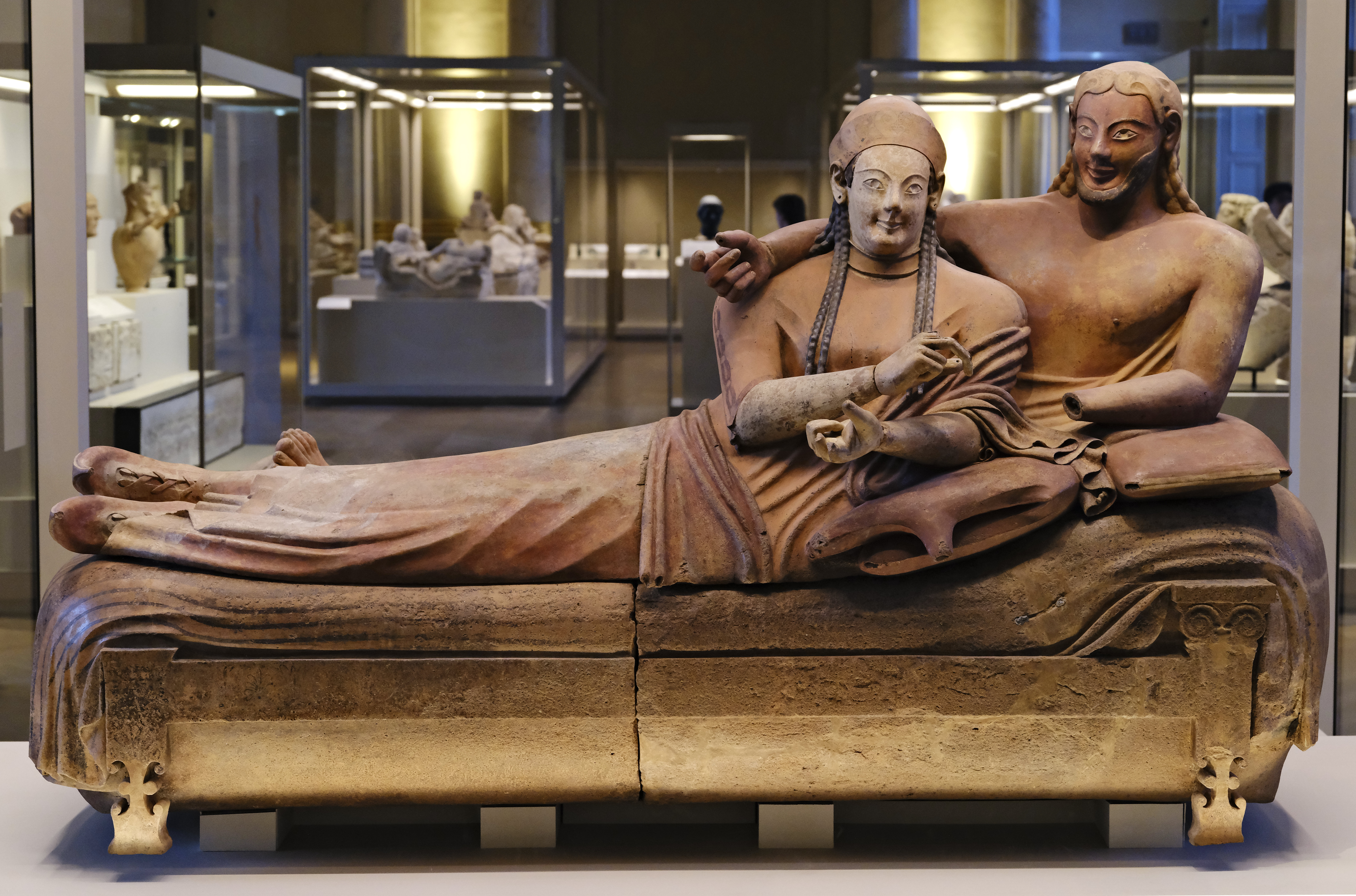
The Sarcophagus of Spouses in the Louvre

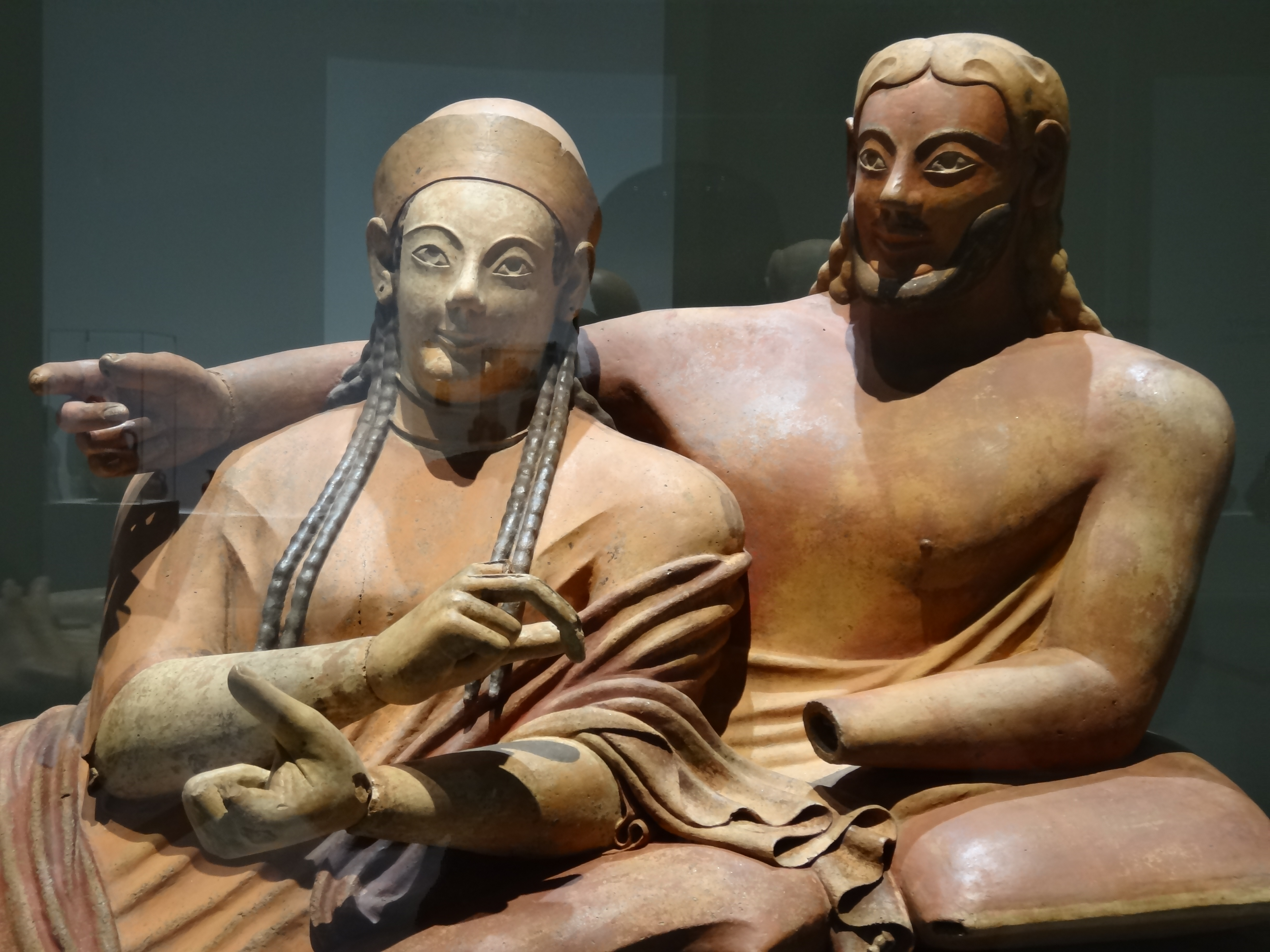
Detail

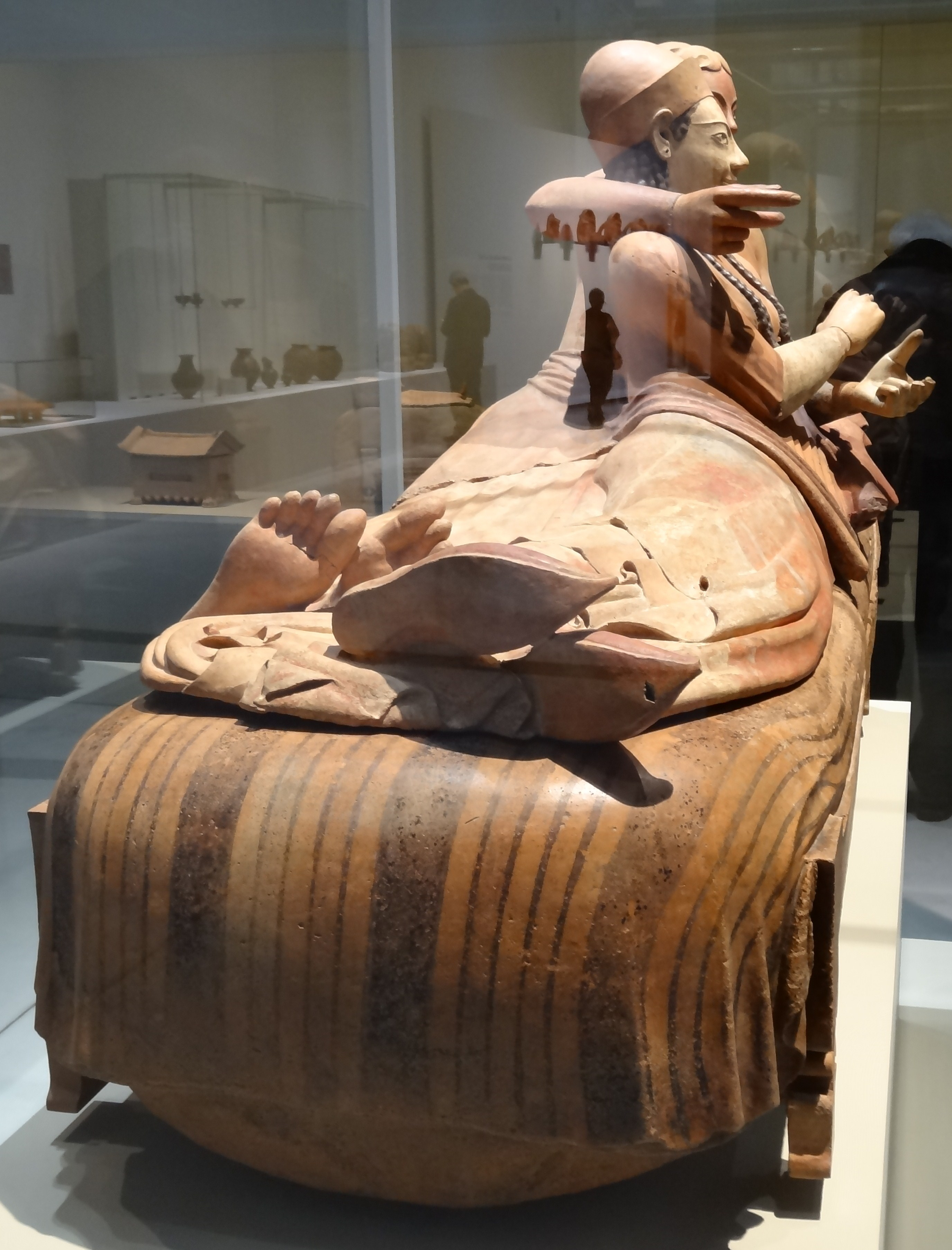
Close-up of the spouses' feet

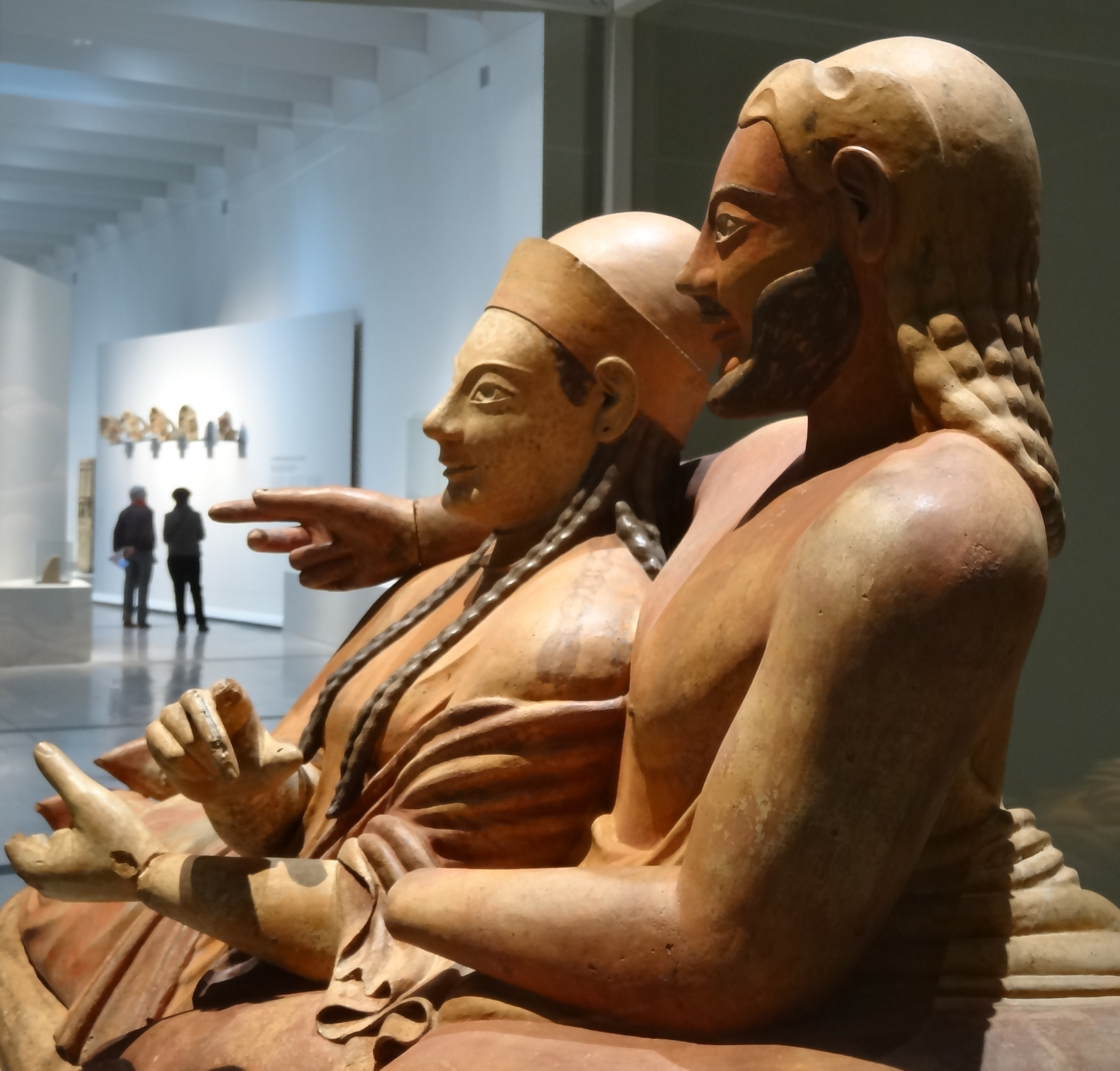
Another view, Louvre

Other examples

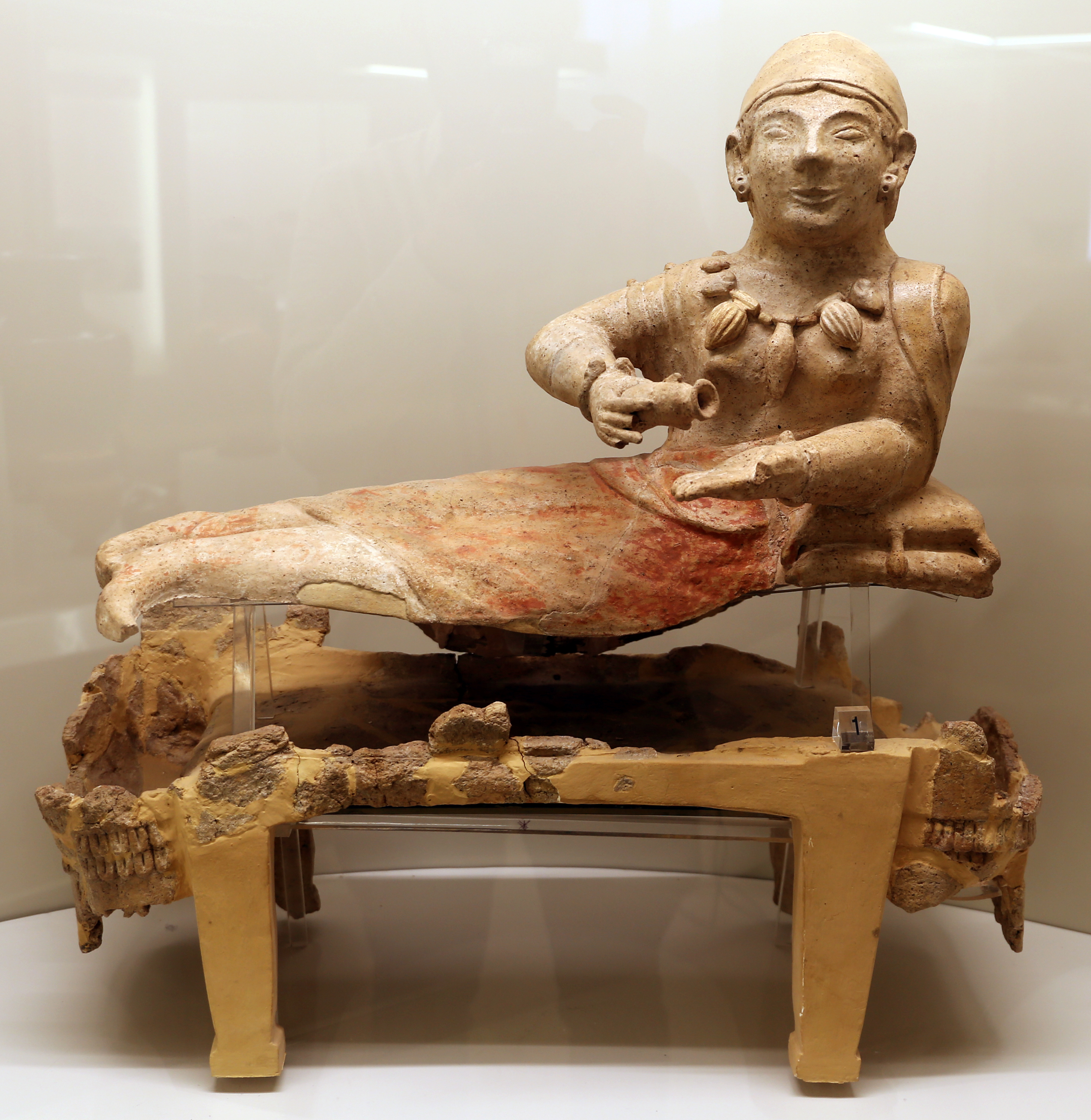
Smaller similar piece, also in the Villa Giulia museum

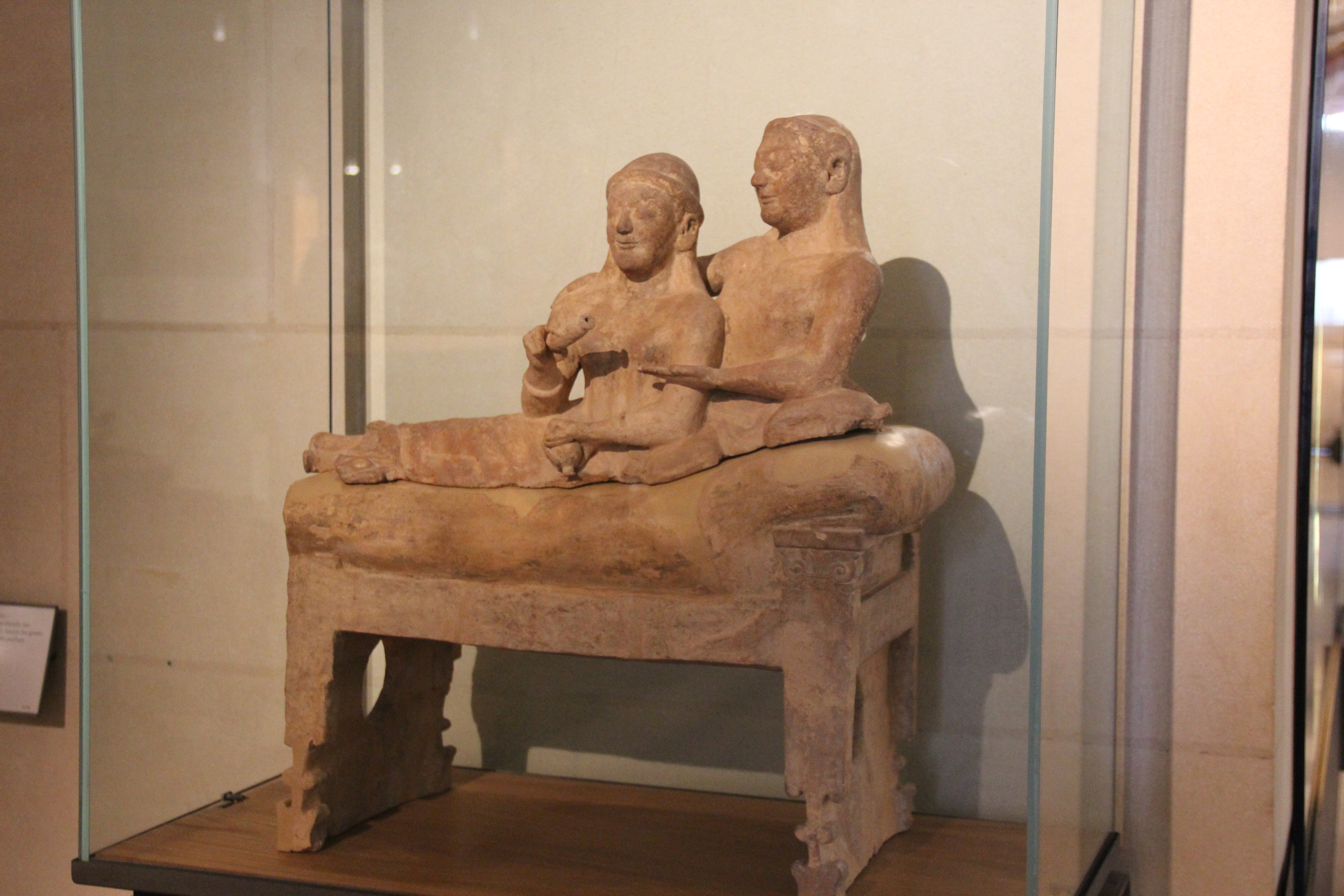
A different example in the Louvre, Caere (modern Cerveteri), 510–500 BCE
