= Poggio Civitate =

Hill and archaeological site in Murlo, Siena, Italy

Coordinates: 43°9′20″N 11°23′58″E

- Murlo
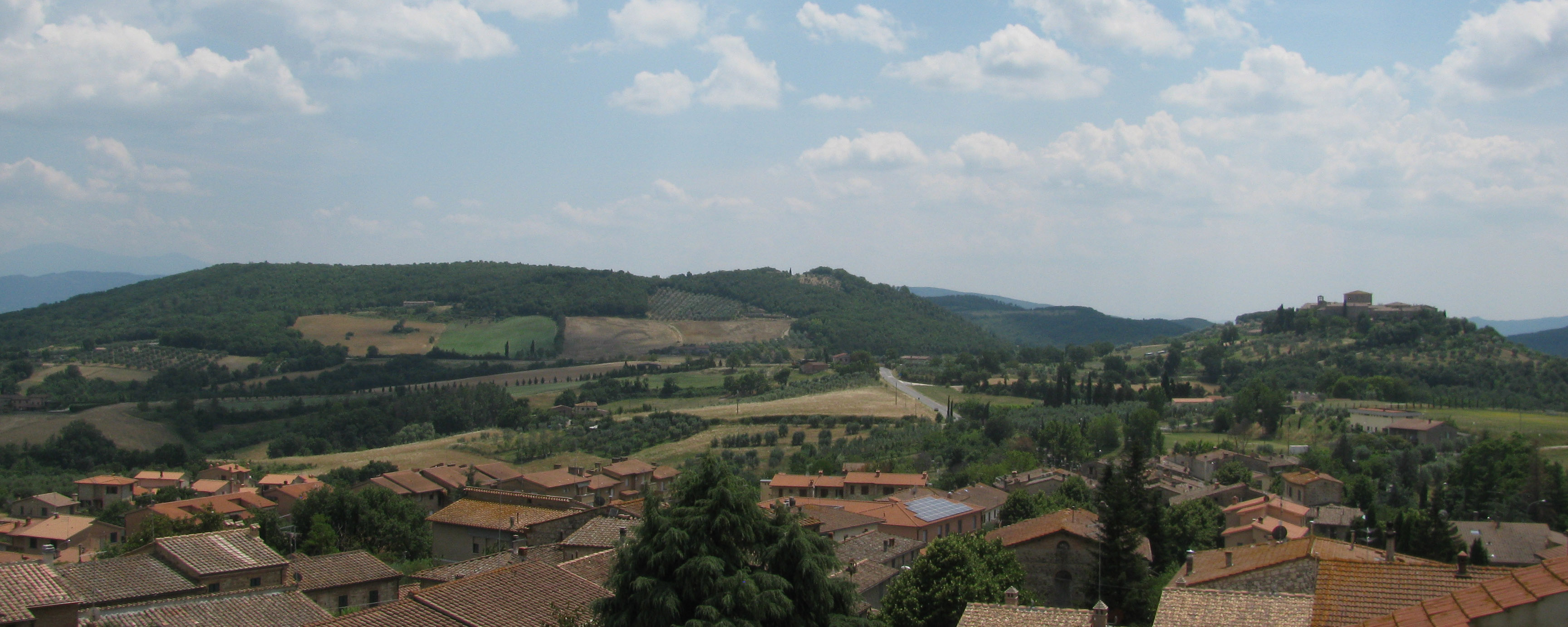
- View of Poggio Civitate (left), Poggio Aguzzo (center) and Murlo (right).

- Location within Tuscany
- Type: Settlement
- Periods: Orientalizing period - Archaic period
- Cultures: Etruscan civilization
- Location: Murlo, Siena, Italy
- Region: Tuscany

History
- Abandoned: late sixth century BC

Site notes
- Excavation dates: 1966-present
- Archaeologists: Kyle Meredith Phillips Jr.; Erik Nielsen; Anthony Tuck
- Condition: ruined
- Public access: yes
- Website: The Poggio Civitate Archaeological Project

Poggio Civitate is a hill in the commune of Murlo, Siena, Italy and the location of an ancient settlement of the Etruscan civilization. It was discovered in 1920, and excavations began in 1966 and have uncovered substantial traces of activity in the Orientalizing and Archaic periods as well as some material from both earlier and later periods.

== Iron Age ==
Limited Iron Age (Villanovan) architectural and artifactual evidence suggests that there was Iron Age activity and possibly Iron Age occupation at Poggio Civitate during the mid-8th to early 7th centuries BCE.

=== Iron Age Hut ===
On an area of the site known as Civitate C, a trench labeled Civitate C 7 (CC7) uncovered the post holes and countersunk floor of a curvilinear, ovoid hut of approximately five by seven meters. After its period of use, this structure appears to have been reused as a midden, including a deposit of over one thousand murex shells (Bolinus brandaris), possibly used for small scale dye production.

=== Iron Age artifacts ===
Location with respect to Italy.

Artifacts, such as fragments of coil-made pottery, an Iron Age technology, suggest a presence of Iron Age Etruscans on Poggio Civitate. An impasto handle fragment has a typology and decorations reminiscent of Iron Age (Villanovan) cover bowls for biconical urns. There are also fragments of bronze fibulae of an Iron Age design. These artifacts have been recovered from an area of the site known as Civitate A as well as from a trench labeled Tesoro 27, which sounded below the ground level of the Intermediate Orientalizing Complex 2(OC2)/Workshop.

== Orientalizing period ==
The Orientalizing period lasted roughly from the early or mid 7th century BCE to the early 6th century BCE. The Orientalizing period at Poggio Civitate is often further divided into the Early Orientalizing Period and Intermediate Orientalizing Period, which last from roughly 630-580 BCE. This period marked the first large scale architectural works being constructed on the site and new technology was used to support new features like the terracotta roofs. Excavations of artifacts and architecture indicate clear class structures with evidence of rich aristocratic homes (the Intermediate Phase Orientalizing Complex) and items along with the more simple homes (non-elite domestic architecture) found throughout Poggio Civitate. The Orientalizing period as a whole was one of renewed Italian and Mediterranean trade as exhibited by the influx of new goods and materials during this time. Products such as Greek pottery and murex shell show this increase in trade.

Five surviving buildings from the Orientalizing period have been uncovered. Early Phase Orientalizing Complex 4(EPOC4) and Early Phase Orientalizing Complex 5(EPOC5) are two buildings from the Early Orientalizing Period. EPOC4 is thought to be a residence and EPOC5 is poorly preserved and thus harder to judge its function. Intermediate Phase Orientalizing Complex 1 (OC1) is a residence, Intermediate Phase Orientalizing Complex 2 (OC2) is a workshop, and Intermediate Phase Orientalizing Complex 3 (OC3) is a tripartite building, with possible religious functions. They were large complexes with decorative tile roofs and were built in the second quarter of the seventh century. All three buildings are thought to have been destroyed by the same fire sometime between 590 and 580 BCE.

=== History of excavations in the orientalizing period ===
In 1970, archaeologists discovered foundations underneath the floor level of the Archaic Building which predated the building. Subsequently, as excavation continued, archaeologists excavated three buildings: Orientalizing Complex 1 (OC1) in 1970, Orientalizing Complex 2 (OC2) in 1980, and Orientalizing Complex 3 (OC3) from 1996 to 1999. However, the discovery of even earlier foundations, structures now called the Early Phase Orientalizing Period Complex (EPOC), showed that OC1, OC2, and OC3 dated to the intermediate phase of the Orientalizing period. This dating schema was further supported by ceramics discovered in the Orientalizing Complex buildings.

=== The Early Phase Orientalizing Complex ===
Once archaeologists differentiated between the Early and Intermediate Phase Orientalizing complexes, they attributed two buildings to the Early Phase Orientalizing Period. The first building was identified as Early Phase Orientalizing Complex 4 (EPOC4). It is located in the west part of the site, and materials found at the site suggest it has a domestic function. Early Phase Orientalizing Complex 5 (EPOC5) is located to the southeast of EPOC4. Unfortunately, EPOC5 is poorly preserved, so the function of the building is more difficult to deduce.

==== Early Phase Orientalizing Complex 4 (EPOC4) ====
EPOC4 was a tremendous rectangular structure built sometime between the end of the 8th century and the beginning of the 7th century BCE at Poggio Civitate. The building, which featured a stone foundation, large porch, and back room, was remarkably similar to structures from the Etruscan settlements of San Giovenale and Rusellae. The foundation was 20.5m long and 7.6m wide, the porch extended 12.8m by 5.7m, and the back room measured 5.35m by 5.1m. The foundation walls were very sturdy, employing an average thickness of 1.1m. While the northern wall was damaged from early excavation practices, the southern wall was completely preserved.

The roof of EPOC4 was constructed with terracotta roofing tiles. Through the investigation of later structures from the site of Poggio Civitate, it was determined that terracotta roofing tiles varied in length but consistently measured 0.54m in width. Furthermore, the foundation walls from EPOC4 were devised to be divisible by this width. Considering buildings from later phases of the site's development employed this same design and featured terracotta roofing tiles, it is plausible to conclude that EPOC4 possessed these tiles.

Through excavation, a variety of materials and items that were found shed light on the uses of EPOC4. Decorative plaques and a horn acroterion suggest that EPOC4 was a domestic space for an aristocratic family. The discovery of grains, seeds, and ceramics from the floor of the porch area indicate that food preparation took place here; spindle whorls and rocchetti were also found, which implies that textile production occurred.

EPOC4 was nearly ten times the size of surrounding domestic spaces. In addition, these smaller domiciles lacked strong foundations, so they were not constructed with terracotta roofing tiles. This suggests that EPOC4 could have been the domestic space for the leading family in the community. However, its close proximity to these domiciles might be the reason for its eventual abandonment in the second quarter of the 7th century BCE. The large porch of EPOC4 was possibly a public space used for gatherings and meals. Eventually, as the elite, aristocratic classes grew amid a developing system of political/social order, it seems their desire for privacy also grew. Perhaps for this reason, EPOC4 was abandoned in the second quarter of the 7th century BCE. After its abandonment, building materials, such as the terracotta roofing tiles and wooden timbers, were likely taken and reused in other spaces, possibly for buildings of the site's Intermediate Phase.

==== Early Phase Orientalizing Complex Building 5 (EPOC5) ====
Early Phase Orientalizing Complex 5 (EPOC5) was found a few meters east of EPOC4 on Piano del Tesoro. This structure was built of irregularly-shaped flat stones that are thought to be the base for a wooden column which would have supported the roof of the building. It is hypothesized to be a workshop contemporary with Early Phase Orientalizing Period 4 (EPOC4).

===== Similarities to Orientalizing Complex 2/workshop (OC2) =====
EPOC5 is thought to be a workshop, because of similarities between its design, specifically its column pads, with Orientalizing Complex 2/Workshop (OC2). Both structures involve a common measurement system of 0.27 meters used during the Orientalizing period. The distance between the column bases at EPOC5 is 2.7m (ten times the uniform distance), and the distance between column pads of OC2 visible in trench Tesoro 26 (T26) is also 2.7m. Another measurement example is found in T30 where the distance between columns pads is 5.4m, twice the measurement of the intercolumniation of EPOC5 and other portions of OC2.

=== Intermediate phase Orientalizing Complex (OC) overview ===
Following the early phase of the Orientalizing period came the next phase, the intermediate phase of the Orientalizing period. The main complex from the intermediate phase consisted of three main buildings. The buildings in this complex served a variety of purposes, from residential to manufacturing, for the benefit of the people of Poggio Civitate. The first building, which was discovered in 1970, is known as the Orientalizing Complex 1 (OC1), and it is believed that this building was a residential building. The second building in the Complex is the Orientalizing Complex 2 (OC2) which was discovered a decade after the first building in 1980. OC2 was believed to be a workshop that produced an assortment of different products from furniture to jewelry, but the main product of this workshop were terracotta roofing materials. Finally, the third building in the complex, discovered in 1996, was the Orientalizing Complex 3 (OC3) which served as some sort of religious building or temple. It is believed that this building was a temple because the floor plan of the building is similar to that of other Etruscan temples.

==== Orientalizing Complex 1 ====
The Orientalizing Complex 1 (OC1) is located within the Poggio Civitate Intermediate Phase Orientalizing Complex. Located at the top of a plateau sat these three massive buildings; the spot would later house the Archaic Building. Each of these buildings had their own individual specific purpose. The Orientalizing Complex 1 functioned primarily as a domicile or residence which was built on the western edge of the Piano del Tesoro Plateau. At the time, these structures represented architectural breakthroughs with their lateral gutter roofs (simae) that guided water into these channels and off the roof. It is unclear how long exactly these buildings had stood for, but there is evidence that they were all destroyed in the same fire that set the hilltop ablaze towards the end of the seventh century BCE.

The total length of Orientalizing Complex 1 is 36.2 m and the width is 8.6 m. Due to the level of deterioration and aging when the Orientalizing Complex was uncovered, little structural evidence can be analyzed, but evidence shows that each building had similar stylistic schemes. The Orientalizing Comlex 1 building had timber superstructures which supported wattle and daub walling. Because of OC1's positioning on the plateau, architects built the structure with diagonal struts to support against the heavy winds. OC1 included of a terracotta roof with pantiles and covertiles constructed from molds. Among other discoveries were cooking utensils, handcrafted ceramics and bronze vessels. Culinary items like small braziers and crockery indicated the type of food production that occurred within the residential complex. Archeologists also uncovered residential objects such as furniture, antler inlays, cosmetics, and figurines that helped decipher the domicile nature of the Orientalizing Complex 1 building. Most of the furniture was designed with geometrical association that consisted of triangles and other patterns. These luxurious items for the time prove that the inhabitants of this residence could have been of higher authority or higher class. Furthermore, exquisite bucchero banquet service suggested that the inhabitants dined extravagantly.

===== Pottery in Orientalizing Complex 1 =====
There were multiple works of Ionian pottery, which dates back to the 7th century BCE, found on the floor of OC1. These were fragmented Ionian cups with large bases and horizontal loop handles. There were also Corinthian, Rhodian, Samian and Chiote amphorae that date back to 620-580 BCE.

==== Intermediate phase Orientalizing Complex 2 (OC2) ====
Orientalizing Complex 2 (OC2) at Poggio Civitate is one of three of buildings located on Piano del Tesoro, one section of Poggio Civitate. It is established that OC2 was a "workshop," as the remains "revealed an abundance of evidence" of what was being produced at the site. This included furniture, wooden items, bronze working, jewelry, and, most prominently, terracotta roofing systems. The floor of OC2 was made of plaster and had "three rows of limestone column pads" that led to a terracotta roof held by wood beams. The column pads are sporadically lined with "auxiliary stones" that are hypothesized to have acted as some form of support for the columns and wooden beams. However, further excavation is required in order to identify their purpose with certainty. There is evidence that either the building that was on the site before OC2 burned down or there was burning used in the construction of OC2, as there was a "concentration of carbon-included soil" under the plaster floor. It is hypothesized that OC2 burned down in the early sixth century BCE, as the remains of an unfinished terracotta roof were found with the "raw clay elements" having been prematurely fired.

===== Industries in intermediate phase Orientalizing Complex 2 =====
A substantial amount of materials recovered in Orientalizing Complex 2 indicate its use as a production center engaged in a variety of different industries. Materials recovered from the building indicate metalworking activity in the eastern area. A number of ceramic pipes and triangular objects which were exposed to high amounts of heat are recognized as having been used as bellows in a small foundry. The equipment is not very large and it was likely used for small-scale production of immediate needs. There was also a large amount of terracotta and ceramic production in the workshop, including the production of pottery and tiles. The conflagration that destroyed the building also fired the raw clay inside the workshop which was being used in the manufacturing of terracotta ceiling tiles. Clay ribbons, of the same dimensions as frieze plaques associated with the Archaic Period Building, were also recovered a few meters west of those tiles. Indentations within the clay contain impressions from the fingers, palms, and feet of laborers working with wet clay in the building at the time of the fire. Found within OC2's western area is a high concentration of animal bones (mostly pigs, sheep, and cattle) with visible cut marks, suggesting it was used in butchering and slaughtering animals. There is also a substantial concentration of red deer bones and antlers, which is consistent with hunting activity. Decorative figurines and plaques have been found within the workshop, including a sphinx carved in antler and depictions of human faces. The workshop was also used for textile production, with the area north of the building containing hundreds of spindle whorls. The whorls are decorated with a variety of stamps, incisions, and dimples. They are also fluted, which is both aesthetically pleasing and presents practical utility by helping to hold thread still during the spinning process.

==== Orientalizing Complex 3/tripartite building (OC3) ====
The Orientalizing Complex 3 (OC3/Tripartite Building) was built around 650 BCE. The building has a terracotta roof, which was relatively rare for Tripartite style buildings during this time. “The building has three adjacent rooms, oriented roughly E-W, measuring roughly 9.2 x 23.2 m, with exceptionally wide rubble foundations (W 1.5 m)”. Tripartite buildings have a long rectangular shape that is divided into three back rooms. The walls of OC3 are much thicker than OC1 and OC2, hinting at the fact that the builders might have been unsure about the thickness of walls needed to support the terracotta roof. Therefore OC3 could have been built before OC1 and OC2. Similar styles of terracotta roofs across OC1 and OC3 allude that both buildings were built during a similar time and supplied by the local workshop. The building itself is believed to have been used as a temple or religious building due to the floor plan being very similar to that of Etruscan temples, with a large central room twice the size of the two side rooms. Items such as bucchero vessels with muluvanice-inscriptions, burned animal bones, and seeds found in and near OC3 also support the theory that the building was an early version of a temple. The OC3/Tripartite building was destroyed in a fire in 590-580 BCE, the same fire also destroyed OC1 and OC2.

=== Intermediate phase orientalizing akroteria ===
The ridge-pole tiles of the roof were decorated with cut-out akroteria. The akroteria was patterendwith many lotus and palmette designs that were thought to be connected to ancestry and progeny. Additionally, attached to the OC1 building was a horse and rider figure and other figures that represented animals.

Fragments of akroteria discovered at Poggio Civitate are nearly life size and made of terracotta, similar to the style that the roofs of the building were constructed. Scholars predict this decision is from Villanovan influence. These statues were built large enough to be seen from a considerable distance, communicating with people that the contents of the building are important.

=== Intermediate phase orientalizing sima ===
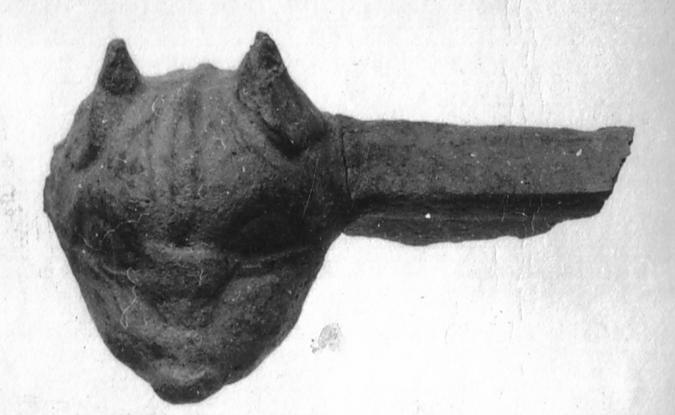
Lateral sima at Poggio Civitate, depicting a frieze of a lion's head.

At Poggio Civitate, lateral sima is used on the three Intermediate Phase Orientalizing Complex buildings. On each building, lateral sima is used along the lower, lateral edge of the roof. The most intact examples are found in association with the OC2/Workshop. Each unit of the modular lateral sima measures 0.54 meters, which is the same unit used to construct each of the three buildings. The lateral sima bears decoration depicting female heads and hand-made feline spouts that have an opening within them to allow for water to flow from the gutter system. The depicted female heads and feline spouts represent Potnia Theron, a fertility divinity. The decoration on the lateral sima could have been painted at one point in time.

=== Orientalizing bucchero ===
Bucchero pottery, a unique style of Etruscan art, has been found at sites across modern day Italy, including at Poggio Civitate. Bucchero styles varied by region; in Southern Etruria, it had light with thin walls (bucchero sottile) and in Northern Etruria, as at Poggio Civitate, it was heavier with thick walls (bucchero pesante).

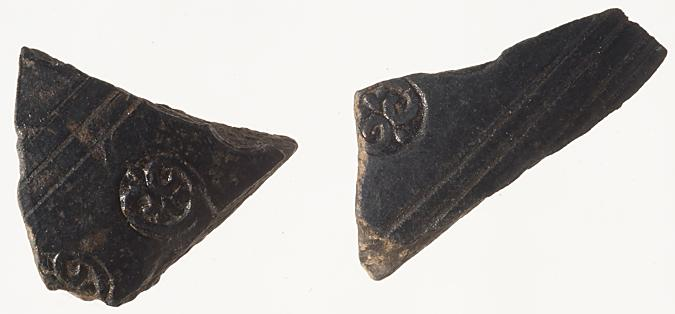
Decorated bucchero pot sherds from Poggio Civitate

Most of the bucchero pottery found at Poggio Civitate during the Orientalizing period was found in OC1/Residence (also known as the Lower Building). Most of the Orientalizing bucchero found at other Italian sites has been in graves and burial contexts, making the domestic context of the Poggio Civitate Orientalizing bucchero somewhat unique. Numerous sherds of various vessel types have been identified at this site, many with decorative patterns. Some of this bucchero pottery may have been produced on site, in OC2/Workshop.

=== Non-elite orientalizing architecture ===
Until recent decades, little attention has been given to determining the nature and characteristics of non-elite, non-monumental structures of the Orientalizing period at Poggio Civitate, with efforts focused instead on analysis of the more physically prominent and better-preserved Early and Intermediate Orientalizing Complexes. Emergent interest in understanding the social organization of the site along with its development over time and in response to known crises (such as the fire which destroyed the Intermediate Orientalizing structures at the beginning of the sixth century BCE) has prompted new research, yielding numerous informative discoveries.

In 2007 and 2008, excavations of a trench at a location known as Civitate C, dubbed “CC7”, immediately south of Piano del Tesoro revealed the foundations of a small curvilinear hut, situated 35 meters away from Orientalizing Complex 2 (OC2), with a difference in elevation of seven meters. The structure was 9 meters by 4 meters in dimension, providing an estimated 28 square-meters of living space, and employed a wooden frame composed of large posts and joists crafted out of local indigenous trees to support a thatched roof of bound reeds. Its position in relation to OC2 along with the fragments of bucchero vessels, ceramic sherds, and bone plaques discovered within the ruins indicate its function to have been a domestic residence of the non-elite variety, removed from the bustling center of the Plain of the Treasure, speculated to have housed lower-status craftsmen who made and owned objects similar to those in the possession of Poggio Civitates's elite.

Archaeological work in the 2012 and 2013 seasons revealed further evidence of non-elite Orientalizing structures in the form of foundation walls belonging to a small building located approximately 70 meters west of Piano del Tesoro at the Civitate A site. The rectilinear base of “CA70” or “Structure 1”, dating to the late seventh century BCE, is situated atop an older, poorly-preserved curvilinear foundation, potentially contemporary with hut structure CC7 discovered at Civitate C. Sharing similar dimensions (4 meters by 6 meters), the interior would have provided a moderate dwelling space of an estimated 24 square-meters, limited further by the presence of a hearth in the center of an earthen floor. The structure's foundations being “not overly robust” evince that it supported a roof of thatch or a similar light material, being unable to hold the weight of terracotta tiles. The discovery of simple plates and drinking cups, along with materials for the production of textiles, indicate the structure's use to have primarily been domestic. Additional remnants of highly eroded structures, referred to as "features" topographically, were also uncovered during the excavations. One such feature consisted of a deposit of wattle and daub (a material known to be used for walls and screens at Poggio Civitate and similar sites), while another exhibited a line of stones, fragments of ceramic, and roofing tiles roughly parallel to Structure 1, comprising a narrow space between CA70 and Feature 2, speculated to have supported a partition for activities between the two locations, or functioning as an improvised shed.

==== Industries in non-elite orientalizing architecture ====
Evidence was found for several industries in the non-elite Orientalizing period architecture in the area known as Civitate A. Evidence of processing and carving of animal carcasses has been found near Structure 1 of Civitate A, including worked bone and antlers that show evidence of the striations associated with a rigid saw. 15 spindle whorls of varying sizes were discovered, which were likely used to produce the thread of wool due to the amount of sheep bones discovered nearby. A singular loom weight was discovered in Structure 1. 31 rocchetti, which were used as spools or bobbins in textile work, were also found. Evidence of metal working is represented by the large quantity of slag found near Structure 1. Crucible fragments, a possible furnace, and bronze artifacts such as pins and fibulae were found that show more evidence of metal working in Civitate A.

== Archaic period ==
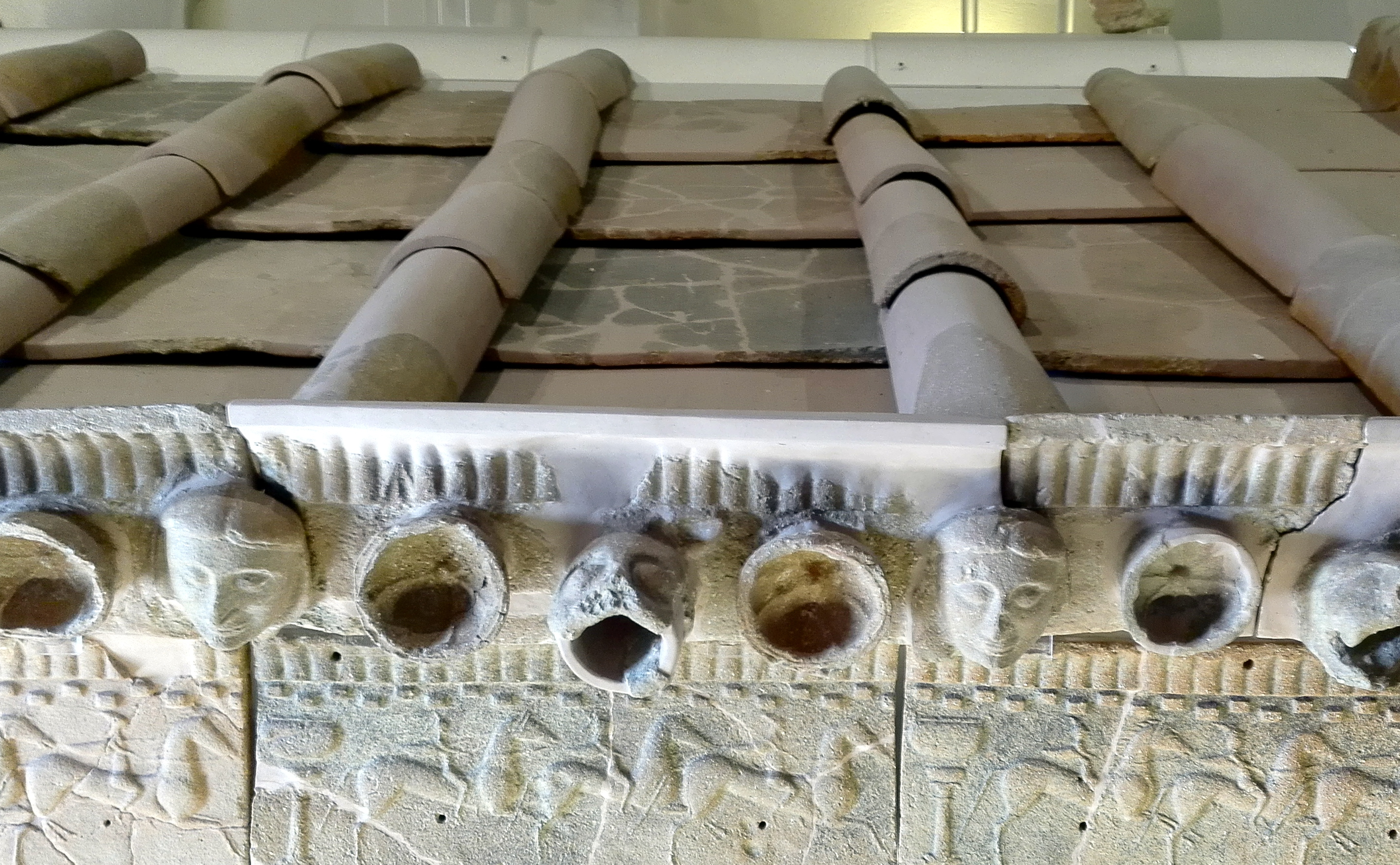
Reconstructed roof section, with frieze of riders below

The Archaic period, lasting from the 7th century BCE to the mid 6th century BCE, saw an enhanced revitalization of the previously destroyed building complex of the Orientalizing period. Prior to the creation of the new Archaic building, survivors salvaged any debris that remained and flattened the plateau, known as Piano del Tesoro, or the "Plateau of the Treasure", to begin construction. The monumental building included elaborate decorations, including frieze plaques with motifs such as a banquet and horse race, gutters, and terracotta statues such as the “Cowboy” akroterion and sphinx akroterion. In the mid-6th century BCE, the building was destroyed and abandoned.

=== The archaic period building ===
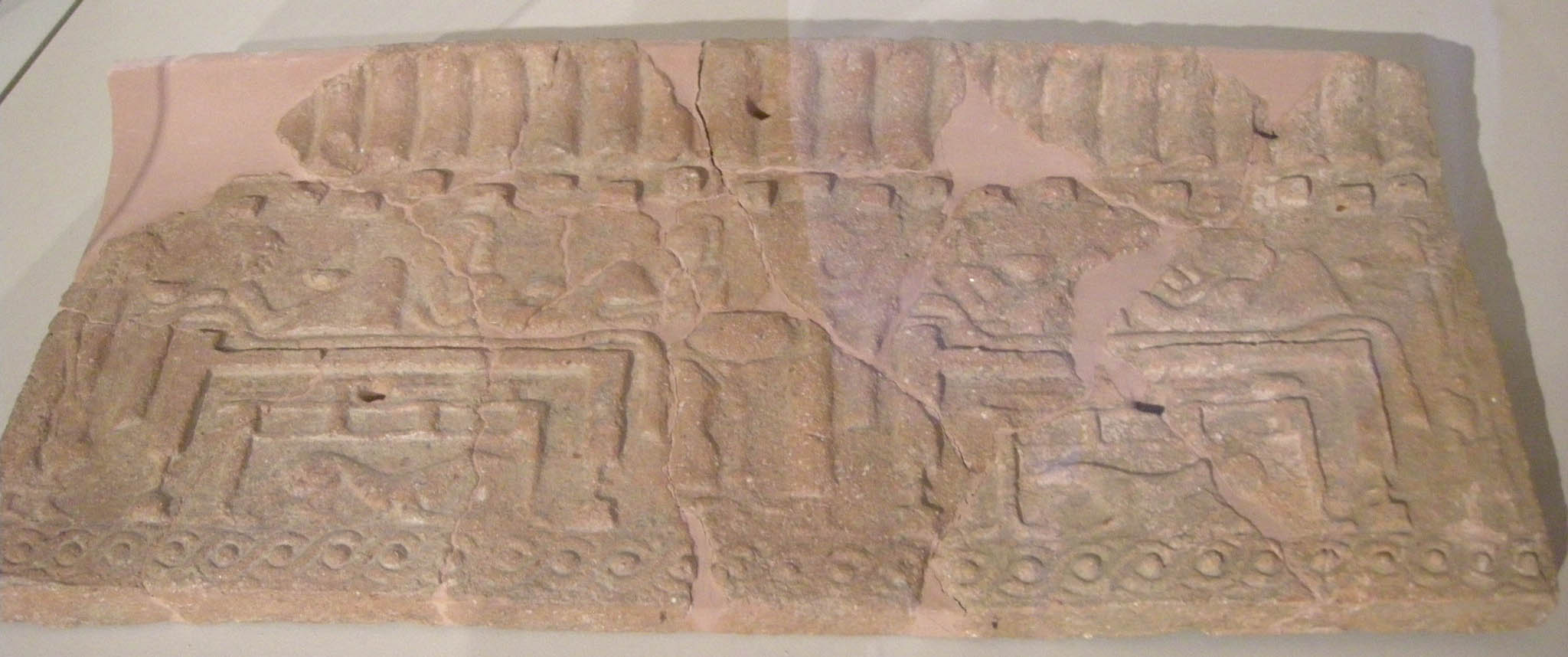
Banquet scene on a terracotta plaque

In the early 6th century BCE, Poggio Civitate produced what is known as the Archaic Building, a monumental complex. The construction was a large four-winged building with a courtyard in the middle of the structure. The roof and the walls of the structure were elaborately decorated with 30,000 feet of non-decorative and decorative terracottas.

It is unknown what the building was used for. There have been several disputes, but the first excavator of Poggio Civitate believed the monumental building was used as a meeting-hall for political and religious events. Others argued that it could have been used as the residence of the ruler, a palazzo, or an Etruscan version of an agora.

=== Archaic akroteria (acroteria) ===
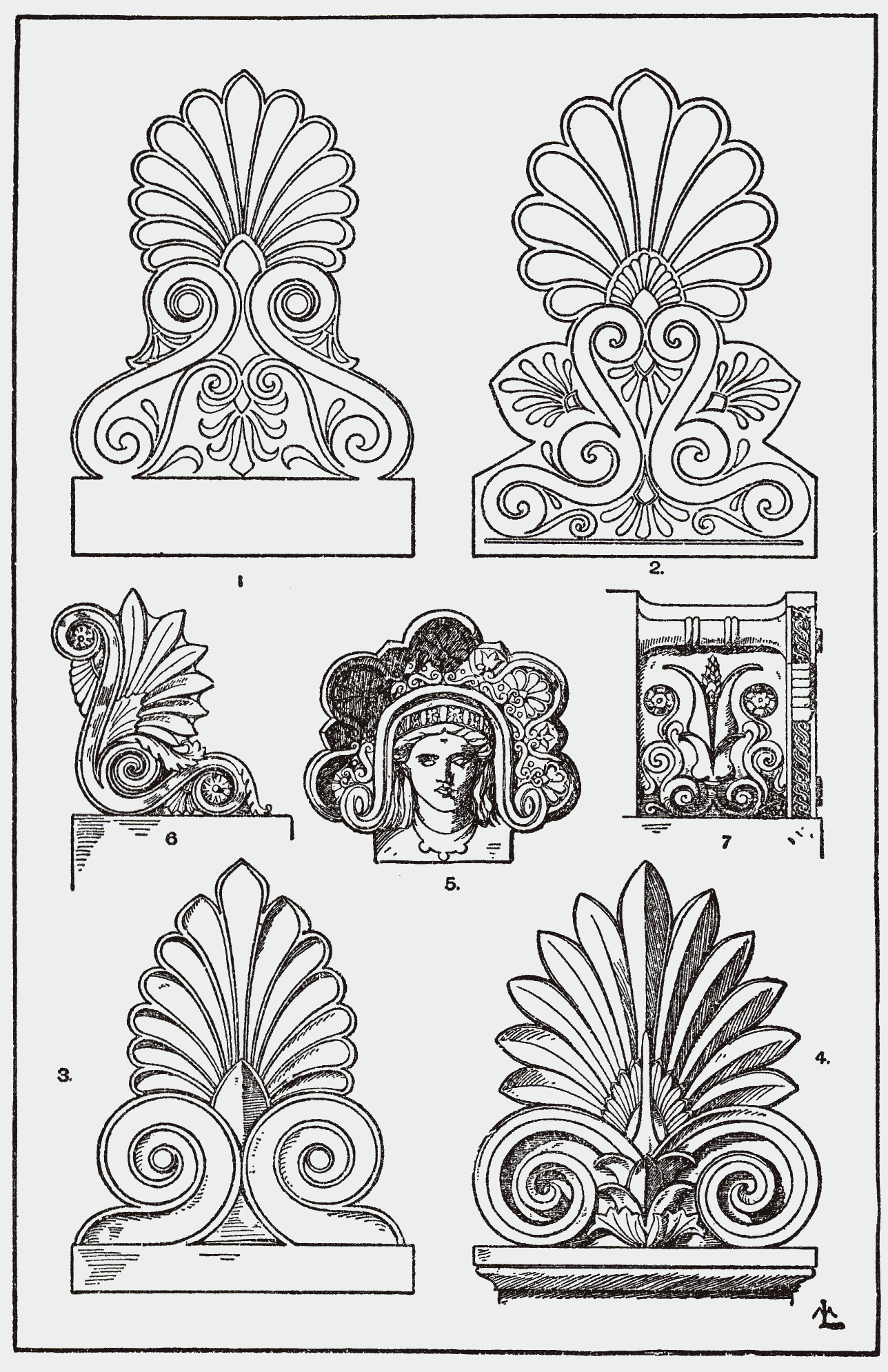
Examples of a few different styles of akroteria.

Use of akroteria at Poggioe Civitate can be first seen in the Intermediate Orientalizing Phase. In earlier periods, elements of what became Archaic akroteria, were seen, but in the Archaic period statues were developed in the round with highly artistic design on these corners and peaks of the Archaic Building. Humanoid elements such as fragments of ears made of terracotta are found among the Archaic akroteria. The famous "Murlo Cowboy" is an example of Archaic acroterion. It has also been argued that these Akroteria created an aura of power and wealth that would impact both those living within and around the buildings they adorned.

=== Archaic period building sima ===
There have been over 206 fragments of both lateral and raking sima found in the debris of the Archaic Building scattered throughout the site. Poggio Civitate's Archaic Building sima was made from terracotta pressed into molds. The sima were attached to the wooden roof beams of the Archaic Building to ensure their security and they were placed around the structure with the decorative details facing downward so all entering the building could see. Lateral sima was the most common type from the Archaic period at the Poggio Civitate site due to the fact that the Archaic building had more lateral areas than area on roof gables to which sima was attached.The lateral sima was adorned with detailed female faces, feline faces, and rosettes in the Archaic style. The raking sima was decorated with dogs chasing hares.

=== Archaic period building frieze plaques ===
Terracotta frieze plaques decorated the exterior of the Archaic Building. The friezes show various scenes including a banquet, horse race, a procession of figures, and a collection of seated figures. They tried to communicate the wealth and power of their settlement through the plaques.

==== Archaic banquet frieze plaque ====
The Archaic banquet frieze plaque is a terracotta relief plaque which shows a scene of a feast or banquet with a variety of people participating in social and celebratory activities. The relief shows several people lounging on couches, which was customary during banquets in the ancient Mediterranean. They are seen taking pleasure in the food and drink, conversing, and taking part in the celebrations. The specifics of the figures' attire, hairstyles, and gestures offer relevant perspectives on the cultural and social facets of Archaic Etruscan society.

==== Archaic horse race frieze plaque ====
The horse race frieze plaque shares a similar style with the three other Archaic friezes. It is approximately 24 cm in height and 55 cm in length. The plaque has a guilloche on the bottom with a double row of alternating rectangular studs on top. There is evidence for at least 65 distinct horserace frieze plaques at Poggio Civitate. It is not certain how the plaques were originally organized. But, the discovery location of many fragments is heavily concentrated in the north-western area of Piano del Tesoro. Looking at the plaque from left to right, there is a cauldron with two curved handles sitting on top of a column as a prize. To the right of the cauldron, there are three figures on horses riding away from the column. The horses are all in the same galloping position, with their front legs stretched forward in the air and their hind legs perpendicular on the ground. They each have long tails protruding from their rears and triangular ears pointing upwards. The horses have long, narrow heads and elongated bodies. Sitting on top of each horse is a miniature jockey wearing a tunic, cape, and pointed cap. They each have hair flowing out the back, separated in beads.

===== Interpretation of the horse race frieze plaque =====
The style of the frieze plaque appears to be an adaptation on Proto-Corinthian pottery. This depiction of horse racing differs from Greek portraits in the style of clothing that the jockeys are wearing. In Greek horse racing, the rider wears a long tunic and no head piece, demonstrating the originality of Etruscan horse racing. Horse racing and chariot racing were very popular events for the Etruscans. It is likely that these horse races influenced the ludi circences in Rome.

==== Archaic procession frieze plaque ====
Similarly to the other three Archaic frieze plaques, the Procession frieze plaque is around 54 cm lengthwise by 24 cm in height. Its top has a convex sturgill molding on a cavetto profile with a molded guilloche below which serves as a border. Looking at the Procession frieze plaque from left to right, it has two identical standing human figures with braided hairstyles and long clothing. These two figures hold reins of horses which pull a cart. The horses in the image are narrow, thin, and somewhat stiff-looking. The head on the inside horse is elevated compared to the horse on the outside. In the middle of the plaque there are two more human figures seated on the cart pulled by the horses. At the right of the plaque are two small human figures, possibly women, that are balancing objects on their heads. At the bottom of the plaque is another molded guilloche border.

===== Interpretation of the procession frieze plaque's iconography =====
One idea is that this plaque's imagery represents a funeral, or more specifically the journey to the funeral. The figures at the right side of the plaque are seen to be taking goods for the burial to be used by the deceased after death. This kind of procession scene has been found also at the Etruscan site of Veii, near Rome. However, this idea that the procession is representing a funeral journey is not the only possibility. Another theme that the procession could represent is a wedding procession. This is due to the fact that two people are being carried by cart with people following behind holding goods. A third interpretation of the representation is that the people on the plaque are traveling to worship the gods. Another event the image has been connected to is a military parade of the Etruscans, in this case coming back from war. A final theory is that the procession scene represents similar iconography and ritual to that of ancient Greek processions. These ancient Greek procession scenes were made in celebration of important life passages and a ritual at festivals.

==== Archaic seated figures frieze plaque ====
At the dig site of the Archaic Building on the plateau of Piano del Tesoro, a terracotta frieze plaque was found depicting figures seated one in front of another. This frieze plaque, along with the other found at this site, are dated to 600 BCE-535 BCE. The plaque measures about 0.239 meters in height, 0.543 meters in width, and has a thickness of about 0.025 meters. Like many frieze plaques dated to the Archaic period of Etruscan society, the plaque depicting the seated figures is made of terracotta; more specifically the clay is classified as coarse. Oftentimes, these decorative plaques depicted the figures of gods or people worshipping gods.

===== Interpretation of the assembly scene =====
The scene depicted on this particular frieze plaque is viewed as a scene of an assembly. Archaeologists and researchers can definitively classify this scene as an assembly based on the furniture the figures are seated on. The third figure from the right is sitting on a cylindrical throne, which is a distinction of status from the 7th century BCE. Along with this unique throne style, the remainder of the seated figures are seated on folding stools with four double-curved animal legs. These stools are staples of assembly scenes involving both gods and mortals. Based on these details and depiction of figures, an interpretation has been made that the plaque contains representations of the gods Zeus, Hera, and Athena. These three gods are commonly depicted together in various pieces from this same time period. Anthony Tuck, an archaeologist from the University of Massachusetts who excavates the site, has argued that the assembly scene depicts a hieros gamos. Although figures on frieze plaques such as this one often portray deities, there has been no concrete evidence suggesting that this particular assembly scene is an ancient Etruscan or Italian mythological representation.

=== Archaic period building gorgon plaques ===
Gorgons are typically represented with a wide mouth, pendulous tongue, flattened nose, fixed eyes, and clean incisions signal it was used as a protective spirit against bad/evil elements. Poggio Civitate's terracotta gorgon head antefixes are identical. Each has a trapezoidal shape, with a curve at the top. The greatest width is located at the base and is no more than 0.190 meters with a maximum height of 0.167 meters. The plaque has a thickness ranging from 0.450 to 0.50 meters. The gorgon's nose is the only projection in the relief. The rest of the face is done in a shallow relief. Hair can be seen in the relief as two coils forming an inverted widow's peak with a slightly off center hairline part. The hair is tapered off to the ears where it then hangs down the sides in three locks that are delineated by grooves with the hair flaring out towards the base. The facial features are simple, yet well defined. The forehead is low and flat with a central depression that protrudes outward up to the eyebrows. The eyebrows curve from the top of the nasal bridge to the outer ear. The eyes are almond shaped and framed with lines giving the left eye a double appearance. The iris is defined by lines as well. The left side of the gorgon was designed by intent so that the ear, eye, and fangs are slightly larger than the right. Many pieces have trace amounts of a dark reddish vermillion paint indicating the pieces were painted, but the color scheme can not be determined. Some tiles have had a whitish color—raising the possibility of a white paint; however, it could also be a component of soil—results are indeterminate at this time.

==== Gorgon head antefixes attachment ====
Two in situ intact gorgon head antefixes were discovered at Poggio Civitate. When plaques reached the leather hard stage, they were affixed to the roof's cover tile creating a right angle rather than a perpendicular line. Wet clay was added to the joint to secure the plaques. The outside clay covering was smoothed to create a finished appearance whereas the inside view of the clay was left rough since it would not be visible. The upper tile tapers to a flange which allows it to be placed under upper tiles to provide a rain tight juncture. The mounting system of the gorgon plaques was not uniform; however, when the gorgons were hung it was possible to draw a horizontal line through the eyes of all them.

==== Gorgonia numbers ====
The north wall of the Archaic Building runs a length of 62.25 meters. With a pantile width of 0.54 meters, this allows for a hypothetical roof hang of 0.5 meters at each end of the building. These figures suggest that there were 113 ±1 gorgonia. It is possible that other walls of the complex held gorgonia, but the absence of fragments and debris piles makes this difficult to determine. Archaic era gorgonia did not survive well the deliberate destruction—only one has been found intact. The plaques appear to be weakest (as evidenced by break lines) at the lower end of the hair. Some gorgons have lost part of their head from the forceful removal of cover tile. It is noteworthy that the gorgon's protuberant nose was rarely destroyed, with only two cases to date were sheared off. Also to date, eighty-two gorgon noses have been discovered; when the noses are matched with lower right hair-the cumulative number rises to 112.

==== Gorgon production ====
Based on their quantity and uniformity, it appears that molds were used to cast the gorgonia. Unfortunately no mold has been discovered to date. Based on the number of gorgonia necessary, it is reasonable to assume that more than one mold was used to increase the rate of production. Based on analysis of mouth and teeth, it appears that at least four molds were used. The exact number cannot be calculated at this time.

=== Activities and industries in the archaic building ===
A few common examples of artifacts are found in the Archaic Building which might indicate activities and industries of the building, despite its complicated stratigraphy and excavation history. Grinding stones are also present at the site, suggesting processing of perhaps grain or other products. Slingstones and arrow tips were found, possibly indicating that the residents of Poggio Civitate manufactured or at least used these weapon types. There are signs that banquets were held within the building, attested by the iconography of a terracotta frieze plaque found that showcases this kind of event. Another set of artifacts found within the Archaic Building was bucchero, a more expensive banqueting ware. There were also signs of impasto wares. Additionally, there were remnants found of what seems to be a stone altar. This was found near the southern wall of the Archaic Building, which is where an earlier structure, called the Orientalizing Complex 3/Tripartite Building was located, which scholars believe to be a focus of religious activity. Both loom weights and spindle whorls were found at the site, indicating that it is likely that textiles were commonly produced at Poggio Civitate.

=== Archaic bucchero ===
Evidence from the site suggests that the Bucchero was a prominent ceramic class for the Etruscans during the Archaic period. Fragments of this pottery style have been scattered throughout several parts of Poggio Civitate. During the Archaic period, this pottery style mostly consisted of finely grained dark grey and black clay. However, some of the uniquely designed pieces were formed with more of an orange-brown color. The walls of the Archaic Bucchero were often thick and included motif or floral decorations along the exterior of the ceramic design.

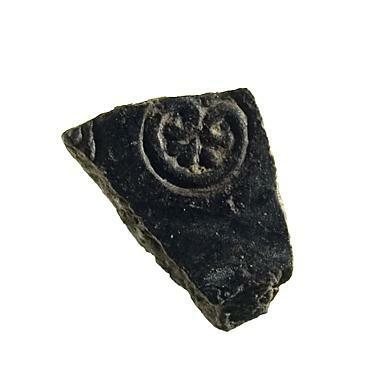
Bucchero vessel fragment with a stamped lotus flower design

At Poggio Civitate, most of the bucchero pottery dated to the Archaic period was found on the outskirts of the Archaic Building, where OC3/Tripartite and OC2/Workshop were located during the Orientalizing period. In Tesoro 46, fragments from a Bucchero-style rocchetto (spool) were recovered, with a black color that was most common during this period. A bucchero sherd of the same color was uncovered in the exact area as the rocchetto, along the outside of the Archaic Building in Tesoro 46. The vessel fragment also contains a stamped flower design, illustrating the frequent decorations included on Archaic bucchero pottery. Additionally, portions of a bucchero rim were found on the side of the Archaic Building nearest to Civitate A, specifically Tesoro South Flank 0. These pieces differ from the previous findings as they contain a more grey color and what appear to be inscribed letter designs. These uncoverings portray how the design of the Archaic bucchero contained slight differences across the sections of Poggio Civitate, while the overarching bucchero style during this period can be seen in all of them.

=== Archaic wells ===
There have been three wells found at Poggio Civitate. All three were found in different series of excavations, the first one from an excavation that occurred between 1970 and 1971. The second well was discovered in 1997 and the third, the most recent excavation, occurred between 2014 and 2015. The excavation sites of the three wells, which are in close proximity to each other, allow for the conclusion that the inhabitants of these wells may not have interacted with each other but were pulling water from the same water source. All three wells were discovered were in the modern property zone known as Civitate A, which further shows how the inhabitants of this site tapped from the same source. The wells of the first and third excavations were not far away from each other, they were roughly twenty meters from each other, yet clearly separated from each other with a wall which alludes to many factors whether it was due to economic reasons or social status, etc. These wells were built and used only during the Archaic period. There has not been any other evidence found for the wells to be older than this time period.

Some of the findings in the wells are terracotta roofing tiles, found in the third well (2015), fragments of one of the gorgon antefixes, and even more roof tiles in the second well (1998). Reports are in agreement that these artifacts were not washed into the wells. The dumping of these materials was done on purpose either to plug the wells, making them unproductive, or simply to get rid of the feature. Unlike these two wells, in the first well that was excavated (1970) there were barely any relics found, rather it was a simple well, that when excavated still held water. With this well, there are many theories as to why there would be no artifacts thrown into it or if there was the possibility of it not yielding enough water for it to be a sufficient source.

An important factor to also view about these wells is the notion of the expansion of population during the Archaic period. The greater the population, the greater need for supplies and resources. There will be further excavations, not only in Civitate A, but in other sites to find other potential wells and further discover about the inhabitants of Poggio Civitate, Murlo.

=== The Destruction ===
The Archaic Period Building of Poggio Civitate, which had been recently constructed, was destroyed in the mid- to late sixth century BCE in a single event, along with the rest of the settlement at Poggio Civitate. This destruction was thorough and complete, and parts of the structure and the roof of the Archaic Period Building were broken and scattered in wells and depressions across the site. There is evidence that certain parts of the Archaic Period Building were targeted in this destruction, specifically decorative architectural terracotta features (frieze plaques, sima, and akroteria) depicting the elite family that most likely ruled Poggio Civitate towards the end of the Archaic period. These aspects were largely parts of the roof structure and they were destroyed systematically. They were then discarded to the western side of the Archaic Period Building in a pit in the ground. More general pieces of the destroyed building, especially broken roof tiles and other debris were thrown into wells discovered west of the building; one of these wells additionally contained a partially destroyed travertine altar that weighed more than 300 kilograms. The walls of the building were left either partially destroyed, or vulnerable to the elements and then decayed over time. There was a single known casualty of the destruction: one fragment of a human skull, who is assumed to have been an individual killed during the event, was found lying outside one of the wells filled with debris.

==== Possible Theories ====
Connections have been made between the destruction of the Archaic Period Building and a growing concern about the defense of the settlement: some scholars even point out that the structures (like watchtowers) that were being constructed resemble defensive buildings of colonial America. There is also evidence, in the form of wells that were constructed immediately prior to the destruction, that there was a sharp increase in people moving closer to the Archaic Period Building, perhaps for security or protection from outside threat. It is possible that this was a result of prior failed attacks on the settlement. One theory for the complete destruction of Poggio Civitate is a political interaction. The sixth century BCE was a violent time in Roman history; Etruscan, Latin, and Umbrian city-states that were most commonly ruled by elite families were engaged in constant conflict. These elite families wanted to extend their power, and often absorbed or destroyed neighboring city-states. Some scholars believe that Chiusi, one example of these rising city-states, was responsible for the destruction at Poggio Civitate because of a series of Tarqiunian style tomb paintings discovered in Chiusi that implied violence between rivaling city-states (possibly Poggio Civitate). The specific targeting of artwork portraying the supposed elite family of Poggio Civitate during the destruction also adds potential credibility to this theory. Another theory that exists is that a ritual destruction of Poggio Civitate occurred. This theory is derived from evidence that an agger, or an artificial mound of earth, was constructed after the destruction of the Archaic Phase Building as a symbolic marker. This agger could have been separating the destroyed structures and uninhabitable land from the land that could continue to be inhabited after the destruction, and that the people of Poggio Civitate themselves had participated in this ritualistic destruction, or "unfounding" of their settlement. This could offer another explanation for the targeting of artwork depicting the elite family; the people of Poggio Civitate wanted to destroy and rebuild their settlement under new leadership. One scholar, Nancy de Grummond, points out that certain aspects of the Archaic Phase Building (the walls) were still standing near the agger at the time of discovery, possibly revealing that the destruction was not so thorough after all and could have been motivated by something other than violence or conquest as the first theory suggests. There is no concrete evidence definitively proving any hypothesis.

==== Abandonment ====
After the final, thorough destruction of Poggio Civitate, it is thought that the site was never reoccupied. There is evidence of people passing through the area, such as a couple Medieval coins and pottery fragments, but no evidence of any type of permanent settlement post-destruction. Nancy de Grummond argues instead that the agger was constructed after the destruction of the Archaic Phase Building on Piano del Tesoro, and could indicate that there was a plan for people to occupy the hill post-destruction, or that people may have in fact continued to inhabit it. This theory is difficult to prove because descriptions and surveys of the agger contain many inconsistencies. So far, there has been no conclusive evidence of settlement on Piano del Tesoro after the destruction of Poggio Civitate, but the volume of artifacts found at the site decreases significantly after the date of destruction.

== Directors of excavation ==
- Kyle M. Phillips – Bryn Mawr College (1966-1973)
- Erik Nielsen & Kyle M. Phillips (1973-1981 co-directors)
- Erik Nielsen – President of Franklin University Switzerland (1973-1996)
- Erik Nielsen & Anthony Tuck (1997-2011 co-directors)
- Anthony Tuck – Associate Professor at the University of Massachusetts Amherst (2011–Present)

== Bibliography ==
=== Books and Monographs ===
--. 1988. Antiquarium di Poggio Civitate. Florence: le tre arti.

Berkin, J. 2003. The Orientalizing Bucchero from the Lower Building at Poggio Civitate (Murlo). Dubuque, IA: Kendall/Hunt Publishing Company.

de Puma, R. and J. P. Small. 1994. Murlo and the Etruscans: Art and Society in Ancient Etruria. Madison: University of Wisconsin Press.

Edlund-Berry, I. E. 1992. The Seated and Standing Statue Akroteria from Poggio Civitate (Murlo). Rome: Bretschneider.

Edlund-Berry, Ingrid E. M. 1997. Local Traditions in the Manufacture of Archaic Etrusco-Italic Terracottas. Thesis Publishers.

Nielsen, E. O. 1994. “Interpreting the Lateral Sima at Poggio Civitate.” In Murlo and the Etruscans: Art and Society in Ancient Etruria, edited by R. de Puma and J. P. Small, 64–71. The University of Wisconsin Press.

Phillips, Jr., K. M. 1993. In the Hills of Tuscany: Recent Excavations at the Etruscan Site of Poggio Civitate (Murlo, Siena). Philadelphia: University of Pennsylvania Museum of Archaeology.

Phillips, Jr., K. M., and A. Talocchini. 1970. Poggio Civitate (Murlo, Siena): The Archaic Sanctuary, Catalogue of the Exhibition, Florence-Siena. Florence: L. S. Olschki.

Phillips, Jr., K. M., and A. Talocchini. 1970. Poggio Civitate (Murlo, Siena): Il Santuario arcaico, Catalogo della Mostra, Firenze-Siena. Florence: L. S. Olschki.

Rystedt, E. 1983. Acquarossa IV: Early Etruscan Akroteria from Acquarossa and Poggio Civitate (Murlo). Stockholm: Paul Astrom.

Tuck, A. 2009. The Necropolis of Poggio Civitate (Murlo): Burials from Poggio Aguzzo. Rome: Giorgio Bretschneider.

Tuck, A. 2021. Poggio Civitate (Murlo). Austin: University of Texas Press.

- Tuck, Anthony; Brunk, Jevon; Huntsman, Theresa; Tallman, Haley (January 2010). "An Archaic Period Well at Poggio Civitate (Murlo): Evidence for Broader Final Destruction". Etruscan Studies. 13 (1). doi:10.1515/etst.2010.13.1.93. S2CID 193097764.

Tuck, A. with A. Coppolara and G. Soderberg. 2018. L’avventura etrusca di Murlo: 50 anni di scavi a Poggio Civitate. Siena: Ara Editrice.

Tuck, A. and R. Wallace with S. Kansa and C. Horvitz. 2015. Vinum: Poggio Civitate and the Goddess of Wine. Boston: Sheridan Press.

Tuck, A. and R. Wallace. 2018. The Archaeology of Language at Poggio Civitate (Murlo). Rome: Bretschneider.

Warden, P. G. 1985. The Metal Finds from Poggio Civitate (Murlo), 1966-1978. Rome: Bretschneider.

Wikander, O. and F. Tobin. 2017. Roof-tiles and Tile-roofs at Poggio Civitate (Murlo): The Emergence of Central Italic Tile Industry. Stockholm: Svenska Institutet I Rom.

=== Book and Monograph Chapters ===
Edlund-Berry, I. 1993. "The Murlo Cowboy: Problems of Reconstruction and Interpretation." In Deliciae Fictiles: Proceedings of the First International Conference on Central Italic Architectural Terracottas at the Swedish Institute in Rome, 10–12 December 1990, edited by E. Rystedt, C. Wikander, and O. Wikander, 117–121. Stockholm: Svenska Institutet i Rom.

Edlund-Berry, Ingrid. 1994. “Ritual Destruction of Cities and Sanctuaries: The ‘Un-Founding’ of the Archaic Monumental Building at Poggio Civitate (Murlo).” In Murlo and the Etruscans: Art and Society in Ancient Etruria, edited by Richard de Puma and Jocelyn Penny Small, 16–28. Madison, Wis.: Univ of Wisconsin Press.

Flusche, L. 2001. “Aristocratic Architectural Iconography at Poggio Civitate.” In From Huts to Houses: Transformations of Ancient Societies: Proceedings of an International Seminar Organized by the Norwegian and Swedish Institutes in Rome, 21 – 24 September 1997, edited by J. Rasmus Brandt and L. Karlsson, 171–177. Stockholm: Paul Astrom.

Gauld, S., S. Kansa, A. Trentacoste, and A. Tuck. 2018. “Out with the Bath Water? Perinatal Human Remains in Pre-Roman Zooarchaeological Assemblages.” In From Invisible to Visible: New Data and Methods for the Archaeology of Infant and Child Burials, edited by J. Tabollli, 133–142. Uppsala: Paul Astrom.

Graen, D. 2011. “Der ‘Palast’ von Poggio Civitate (Murlo): Heiligtum oder Adelsresidenz?” In Keraunia: Beiträge zu Mythos, Kult, und Heiligtum in der Antike, edited by O. Pilz and M. Vonderstein. Berlin: De Gruyter.

Kreindler, K. 2018. “Subordinate Satellite Communities of Poggio Civitate.” In The Archaeology of Death: Proceedings of the Seventh Conference of Italian Archaeology Held at the National University of Ireland, Galway, April 16–18, 2016, 128–37. Oxford: Archaeopress.

Nielsen, E. O. 1984. “Lotus Chain Plaques from Poggio Civitate.” In Studi di antichità in onore di Guglielmo Maetzke, edited by M. G. Marzi Costagli and L. Tamagno Perna, 397–399. Rome: Bretschneider.

Nielsen, E. O. 1984. “Speculations on an Ivory Workshop of the Orientalizing Period.” In Crossroads of the Mediterranean: Papers Delivered at the International Conference on the Archaeology of Early Italy, Haffenreffer Museum Brown University, 8–10 May 1981, edited by T. Hackens, N. D. Holloway, and R. Ross Holloway, 333–348. Providence: Brown University Press.

Nielsen, E. O. 1995. “Further Evidence of Metal Working at Poggio Civitate.” In Antiche officine del bronzo: materiali, strumenti, tecniche: atti del Seminario di studi ed esperimenti, Murlo, 26-31 Iuglio 1991, edited by E. Formigli, 29–40. Siena: Nuova immagine editrice.

Nielsen, E. O. 1997. “Aspetti della produzione artigianale a Poggio Civitate.” Preziosi in oro, avorio, osso e corno: arte e tecniche degli artigiani etruschi: atti del seminario di studi ed esperimenti, Murlo, 26 settembre - 3 ottobre, 1992, edited by E. Formigli, 19–26. Siena: Nuova immagine editrice.

Nielsen, E. O. and A. Tuck. 2005. “Scavi di Poggio Civitate: 1975-1999: Un breve resoconto.” In Ministero per i Beni e le attività Culturali: La presentazione di attività archeologica, edited by A Palochini, 843–848. Rome: ---.

Phillips, Jr., K. M. 1974. “Poggio Civitate (Murlo, Siena), 1966-1972.” In Aspetti e problemi dell’Etruria interna: Atti dell’VIII Convegno Nazionale di Studi Etruschi ed Italici, Orvieto, 27-30 giugno 1972, edited by L. S. Olschki, 141–146. Florence: Leo S. Olschki.

Phillips, Jr., K. M. 1976. “Poggio Civitate (Murlo).” In The Princeton Encyclopaedia of Classical Sites, edited by R. Stillwell, 719. Princeton: Princeton University Press.

Phillips, Jr., K. M. 1984. “Protective Masks from Poggio Civitate and Chiusi.” In Studi di antichità in onore di Guglielmo Maetzke, edited by M. G. Marzi Costagli and L. Tamagno Perna, 413–417. Rome: Bretschneider.

Phillips, Jr., K. M. 1986. “Masks on a Canopic Urn and an Etruscan-Corinthian Perfume Pot.” In Italian Iron Age Artefacts in the British Museum, Papers of the Sixth British Museum Classical Colloquium, London, 10–11 December 1982, 153–55. London.

Phillips, Jr., K. M. 1994. “Stamped Impasto Pottery Manufactured at Poggio Civitate.” In Murlo and the Etruscans: Art and Society in Ancient Etruria, edited by R. De Puma and J. P. Small, 29–46. Madison, Wis.: Univ of Wisconsin Press.

Rathje, A. 1989. “Alcune considerazioni sulle lastre da Poggio Civitate con figure femminili.” In Le donne in Etruria, edited by A. Rallo, 75–84. Bari: Laterza.

Rathje. 1994. “Banquet and Ideology: Some New Considerations about Banqueting at Poggio Civitate.” In Murlo and the Etruscans: Art and Society in Ancient Etruria, 95–99. Madison, Wis.: Univ of Wisconsin Press.

Rowland, I. D. 1994. “Early Attestations of the Name ‘Poggio Civitate’.” In Murlo and the Etruscans: Art and Society in Ancient Etruria, 3-5. Madison: University of Wisconsin Press.

Rystedt, E. 1994. “Additional Notes on Early Etruscan Akroteria.” In Murlo and the Etruscans, edited by R. de Puma and J. P. Small. Madison: The University of Wisconsin Press.

Sinos, R. H. 1994. “Godlike Men: A Discussion of the Murlo Procession Frieze.” In Murlo and the Etruscans: Art and Society in Ancient Etruria, 100–117. Madison: University of Wisconsin Press.

Small, J. P. 1994. “Eat, Drink, and Be Merry: Etruscan Banquets.” In Murlo and the Etruscans: Art and Society in Ancient Etruria, 85–94. Madison, Wis.: Univ of Wisconsin Press.

Staccioli, R. A. 1976. “Considerazioni sui complessi monumentali di Murlo e di Acquarossa.” In Mélanges offerts à Jacques Heurgon: L’Italie préromaine et la Rome républicaine, Collection de l’ecole française de Rome, edited by R. Bloch, 961–972. Rome: Ecole française de Rome.

Tobey, M. H., E. O. Nielsen, and M. W. Rowe. 1986. “Elemental Analysis of Etruscan Ceramics from Murlo, Italy.” In Proceedings of the 24th International Archaeometry Symposium, edited by J. S. Olin and M. J. Blackman, 115–127. Washington, D.C.: Smithsonian Institution Press.

- Tuck, Anthony (2006). "The Social and Political Context of the 7th Century Architectural Terracottas at Poggio Civitate (Murlo)". In Edlund-Berry, Ingrid E. M.; Greco, Giovanna; Kenfield, John (eds.). Deliciae Fictiles III. Architectural Terracottas in Ancient Italy. New discoveries and Interpretations. Oxbow Books. pp. 130–135. ISBN 978-1-84217-208-7.

Tuck, A. 2016. “Poggio Civitate: Community Form in Inland Etruria.” In A Companion to the Etruscans, edited by S. Bell and A. Carpino, 205–216. Oxford: Wiley Blackwell.

Tuck, A. 2016. “The Three Phases of Elite Domestic Space at Poggio Civitate.” In Dalla capanna al palazzo. Edilizia abitativa nell’Italia preromana. Atti del XXIII Convegno Internazionale di Studi sulla Storia e l’Archeologia dell’Etruria, edited by G. M. della Fina, 301–317. Orvieto: Quasar.

Tuck, A. 2018. “Recent Discoveries at Poggio Civitate (Murlo).” In Atti del XXIII Convegno Internazionale di Studi sulla Storia e l’Archeologia dell’Etruria, edited by G. della Fina, 497–510. Orvieto: Quasar.

Tuck, A. 2020. “Resource and Ritual: Manufacturing and Production at Poggio Civitate.” In Making Cities: Economies of Production and Urbanisation in Mediterranean Europe 1000-500 BCE: International symposium 18–19 May 2017, edited by M. Gleba, B. Marín, and B. Dimova, 147–160. Cambridge: McDonald Institute Monographs.

Tuck, A. and R. Wallace. 2017. “Inscriptions on Locally Produced Ceramic Recovered from Poggio Civitate (Murlo): Literacy and Community.” In Beiträge zur Sozialgeschichte der Etrusker: Akten der internationalen Tagung, Wien 8–10 June 2016, edited by L. A. Foresti and P. Amman, 65–73. Vienna: Holzhausen der Verlag.

Warden, P. G. 1991. “Copper, Iron, and Smelting Technologies in Iron Age Etruria. New Evidence from Poggio Civitate (Murlo).” In Antiche Officine del Bronzo, Materiali, Strumenti, Tecniche, Atti del Seminario di Studi ed Esperimenti (Murlo 1991), edited by Formigli, E., 41–49. Siena.

Wikander, Örjan. 1994. “The Archaic Etruscan Sima.” In Murlo and the Etruscans, ed. de Puma, R., and J. P. Small. Madison: University of Wisconsin Press.

Winter, N. A. 1994. “A Terracotta Griffin Head from Poggio Civitate (Murlo).” In Murlo and the Etruscans: Art and Society in Ancient Etruria, edited by R. de Puma and J. P. Small, 72–76. Madison: University of Wisconsin Press.

=== Articles ===
- Bianchi Bandinelli, R. 1926. “Murlo (Siena) – Monumenti archeologici nel territorio.” Notizie degli scavi di antichità 51: 165–170.
- Bianchi Bandinelli, R. 1972. “Qualche osservazione sulle statue acroteriali di Poggio Civitate (Murlo).” Dialoghi di Archeologia 6: 236–247.
- Blanck, H. 1970. “Murlo.” Archäologischer Anzeiger 85: 288–290.
- Bouloumié, Bernard (1972). "Murlo (Poggio Civitate, Sienne) : céramique grossière locale. L'instrumentum culinaire". Mélanges de l'École française de Rome: Antiquité. 84 (1): 61–110. doi:10.3406/mefr.1972.919.
- Bouloumié, Bernard (1978). "Nouveaux instruments culinaires (?) en céramique de Murlo (Poggio Civitate)". Mélanges de l'École française de Rome: Antiquité. 90 (1): 113–131. doi:10.3406/mefr.1978.1141.
- Bouloumié-Marique, Antoinette (1978). "La céramique commune de Murlo (Poggio Civitate)". Mélanges de l'École française de Rome: Antiquité. 90 (1): 51–112. doi:10.3406/mefr.1978.1140.
- Cristofani, Mauro (1975). "Considerazioni su Poggio Civitate (Murlo, Siena)". Prospettiva (1): 9–17. JSTOR 24412838.
- Cristofani, M. and K. M. Phillips, Jr. 1970. “Ager Clusinus (Poggio Civitate, Murlo, Siena).” Studi Etruschi 38: 288–292.
- Cristofani, M. and K. M. Phillips, Jr. 1971. “Poggio Civitate: Etruscan Letters and Chronological Observations.” Studi Etruschi 39: 1-22.
- Cutler, Joanne; Dimova, Bela; Gleba, Margarita (October 2020). "Tools for textiles: Textile production at the Etruscan settlement of Poggio Civitate, Murlo, in the seventh and sixth centuries BC". Papers of the British School at Rome. 88: 1–30. doi:10.1017/S006824622000001X. S2CID 214362250. ProQuest 2444277596.
- Damgaard Andersen, H. 1990. “The feline waterspouts of the lateral sima from the Upper Building at Poggio Civitate, Murlo”. Opuscula Romana 18: 61–98.
- De Grummond, Nancy T. (January 1997). "Poggio Civitate: a turning point". Etruscan Studies. 4 (1). doi:10.1515/etst.1997.4.1.23. S2CID 201092342.
- De Puma, Richard Daniel (1981). "Etruscan Gold and Silver Jewelry from Poggio Civitate (murlo)". Archeologia Classica. 33: 78–92. JSTOR 44365612.
- Donati, L. 1971. “Frammento di bucchero con rappresentazione di cavalieri, da Poggio Civitate (Murlo).” Studi Etruschi 39: 307–311.
- Donoghue, Nora K. (7 January 2022). "Following the Thread: Elite Iconography on Weaving Objects at Poggio Civitate (Murlo)". Arts. 11 (1): 15. doi:10.3390/arts11010015.
- Edlund, I. 1985. "A Terracotta Head from Poggio Civitate (Murlo)," Opuscula Romana 15: 47-53
- Edlund, I. 1985. “Man, Nature, and the Gods: A Study of Rural Sanctuaries in Etruria and Magna Graecia from the Seventh to the Fourth Century B.C.” British Archaeological Reports 246: 21–32.
- Edlund-Berry, I. 1989. “Four Terracotta Heads from Poggio Civitate (Murlo); Towards a Definition of the ‘Murlo Style’.” Opuscula Romana 17(3): 21-32.
- Edlund Gantz, I. 1972. "The Seated Statue Akroteria from Poggio Civitate (Murlo).” Dialoghi di Archeologia 6: 167–235.
- Ferri, S. 1978. “Osservazioni ad alcune statue del Murlo-Poggio Civitate (Siena).” Atti dell’Accademia nazionale dei Lincei: Rendiconti 33: 3–8.
- Fullerton, M. 1982. “The Terracotta Sphinx Akroteria from Poggio Civitate (Murlo).” Mitteilungen des deutschen archäologischen Instituts, Römische Abteilung 89: 1-26.
- Gantz, T. N. 1971. “Divine Triads on an Archaic Etruscan Frieze Plaque from Poggio Civitate (Murlo).” Studi Etruschi 39: 1–12.
- Gantz, T. N. 1974. “The Procession Frieze from the Etruscan Sanctuary at Poggio Civitate.” Mitteilungen des Deutschen Archäologischen Instituts, Römische Abteilung 81: 1–14.
- Gauld, Suellen C.; Kansa, Sarah W.; Tuck, Anthony (7 November 2018). "Perinatal Human Remains from Poggio Civitate (Murlo): A Preliminary Presentation". Etruscan Studies. 21 (1–2): 3–26. doi:10.1515/etst-2017-0031. S2CID 189188094.
- Gleba, Margarita (January 2000). "Weaving at Poggio Civitate (Murlo)". Etruscan Studies. 7 (1). doi:10.1515/etst.2000.7.1.105. S2CID 201642349.
- Donoghue, Nora K. (7 January 2022). "Following the Thread: Elite Iconography on Weaving Objects at Poggio Civitate (Murlo)". Arts. 11 (1): 15. doi:10.3390/arts11010015.
- Glennie, A. E. 2017. T89 (2017-06-30):1-8; Introduction from Europe/Italy/Poggio Civitate/Tesoro/Tesoro 89/T89 2017. OpenContext. https://n2t.net/ark:/28722/k2s18877z
- Hollingsworth, K. P. 2017. CA89 (2017-08-05):2-7; Introduction from Europe/Italy/Poggio Civitate/Civitate A/Civitate A89/CA89 2017. OpenContext. https://n2t.net/ark:/28722/k27h1w16f
- Morpurgo, Giulia (2019). "Applique a Protome Di Acheloo Dal Sepolcreto Etrusco De Luca Di Bologna". Archeologia Classica. 70: 509–534. JSTOR 27119328.
- Kansa, Sarah Whitcher; Tuck, Anthony (February 2023). "'Where the Wild Things Are': Etruscan Hunting and Trophy Display at Poggio Civitate (Murlo), Italy". European Journal of Archaeology. 26 (1): 81–100. doi:10.1017/eaa.2022.28. S2CID 251543586.
- Kansa, Sarah Whitcher; MacKinnon, Michael (31 January 2014). "Etruscan Economics: Forty-Five Years of Faunal Remains from Poggio Civitate". Etruscan Studies. 17 (1). doi:10.1515/etst-2014-0001. S2CID 130165560.
- Kreindler, K. R. 2017. CA86 (2017-06-26):3-10; Introduction from Europe/Italy/Poggio Civitate/Civitate A/Civitate A86/CA86 2017. OpenContext. https://n2t.net/ark:/28722/k2tx3mm4z
- MacIntosh, J. 2017. JM II (1971-07-29):114-125; Summary from Europe/Italy/Poggio Civitate/Tesoro/Tesoro 15 and Pozzo/1971, ID:66. OpenContext. https://n2t.net/ark:/28722/k24j0s94v
- MacIntosh, J. 1974. “Representations of Furniture on the Frieze Plaques from Poggio Civitate (Murlo).” Mitteilungen des Deutschen Archäologischen Instituts, Römische Abteilung 81: 15–40.
- Massa-Pairault, Françoise-Hélène (1986). "Les jeux équestres de Poggio Civitate. Représentation et société". Ktèma. 11 (1): 179–187. doi:10.3406/ktema.1986.2644. S2CID 193058956.
- Melis, F. and A. Rathje. 1984. “Considerazioni sullo studio dell’architettura domestica arcaica.” Archeologia laziale 6: 382–395.
- Neils, J. 1976. “The Terracotta Gorgoneia of Poggio Civitate (Murlo).” Mitteilungen des Deutschen Archäologischen Instituts, Römische Abteilung 83: 1-29.
- Nielsen, E. O. 1983. “Excavations at Poggio Civitate.” Studi e Materiali 6: 245–259.
- Nielsen, E. O. 1987. “Some Preliminary Thoughts on Old and New Terracottas.” Opuscula Romana 16(5): 91–119.
- Nielsen, E. O. 1989. “A New Lateral Sima from Poggio Civitate (Murlo).” In Atti del Secondo Congresso Internazionale Etrusco. Firenze, 26 maggio–2 giugno 1985, 509–515.
- Nielsen, E.O. 1989. “Excavations at Poggio Civitate.” American Journal of Archaeology 93: 258.
- Nielsen, E. O. 1991. “Excavations at Poggio Civitate.” Studi e Materiali 6: 245–255.
- Nielsen, Erik (January 1998). "Bronze Production at Poggio Civitate (Murlo)". Etruscan Studies. 5 (1). doi:10.1515/etst.1998.5.1.95. S2CID 110153077.
- Nielsen, E. O. and K. M. Phillips, Jr. 1974. “Bryn Mawr College Excavations in Tuscany, 1973.” American Journal of Archaeology 78: 265–278.
- Nielsen, Erik; Phillips, Kyle Meredith (October 1975). "Bryn Mawr College Excavations in Tuscany, 1974". American Journal of Archaeology. 79 (4): 357–366. doi:10.2307/503068. JSTOR 503068. S2CID 194142802.
- Nielsen, E. O. and K. M. Phillips, Jr. 1976. “Poggio Civitate (Siena)--Gli scavi del Bryn Mawr College dal 1966 al 1974.” Notizie degli scavi di antichità 30: 113–147.
- Nielsen, Erik O.; Phillips, Kyle Meredith (1977). "Bryn Mawr College Excavations in Tuscany, 1975". American Journal of Archaeology. 81 (1): 85–100. doi:10.2307/503653. JSTOR 503653. S2CID 191386607.
- Nielsen, E. O. and K. M. Phillips, Jr. 1977. “Murlo (Siena).” Studi Etruschi 45: 464–465.
- Nielsen, E. O. and K. M. Phillips, Jr. 1983. “Poggio Civitate (Siena). The Excavations at Murlo in 1976-1978.” Notizie degli scavi di antichità 37: 5-24.
- Nielsen, E. O. and A. Tuck. 2001. “An Orientalizing Period Complex at Poggio Civitate (Murlo): A Preliminary View.” Etruscan Studies 8: 35–63.
- Tuck, Anthony; Nielsen, Erik (January 2008). "The Chronological Implications of ReliefWare Bucchero at Poggio Civitate". Etruscan Studies. 11 (1). doi:10.1515/etst.2008.11.1.49. S2CID 180720114.
- O'Donoghue, Eóin (2013). "The Mute Statues Speak: The Archaic Period Acroteria from Poggio Civitate (Murlo)". European Journal of Archaeology. 16 (2): 268–288. doi:10.1179/1461957112Y.0000000029. S2CID 161150943.
- Phillips, Jr. K. M. 1966. “Poggio Civitate (Siena)--Campagna di scavo 1966 del Bryn Mawr College in Toscana.” Notizie degli scavi di antichità 20: 5–17.
- Phillips, Kyle Meredith (April 1967). "Bryn Mawr College Excavations in Tuscany, 1966". American Journal of Archaeology. 71 (2): 133–139. doi:10.2307/501995. JSTOR 501995. S2CID 192497812.
- Phillips, Jr., K. M. 1967. “Scavi dell’universita di Bryn Mawr a Poggio Civitate (Murlo, provincia di Siena).” Dialoghi di Archeologia 1: 245–247.
- Phillips, Kyle Meredith (April 1968). "Bryn Mawr College Excavations in Tuscany, 1967". American Journal of Archaeology. 72 (2): 121–124. doi:10.2307/502835. JSTOR 502835.
- Phillips, Jr., K. M. 1968. “Scavi del Bryn Mawr College in Toscana durante l’estate 1967.” Dialoghi di archeologia 2: 104–106.
- Phillips, Kyle Meredith (July 1969). "Bryn Mawr College Excavations in Tuscany, 1968". American Journal of Archaeology. 73 (3): 333–339. doi:10.2307/503514. JSTOR 503514. S2CID 194175241.
- Phillips, Jr., K. M. 1969. “Poggio Civitate (Siena)--Campagna di scavi 1967 del Bryn Mawr College.” Notizie degli scavi di antichità 23: 38–50.
- Phillips, Jr., K. M. 1970. “Bryn Mawr College Excavations in Tuscany, 1969.” American Journal of Archaeology 75: 257–261.
- Phillips, Kyle Meredith (1 July 1971). "Bryn Mawr College Excavations in Tuscany, 1970". American Journal of Archaeology. 75 (3): 257–261. doi:10.2307/503960. JSTOR 503960. S2CID 194177617.

Phillips, Jr., K. M. 1972. “Bryn Mawr College Excavations in Tuscany, 1971.” American Journal of Archaeology 76(3): 249–255.

Phillips, Jr., K. M. 1973. “Bryn Mawr College Excavations in Tuscany, 1972.” American Journal of Archaeology 77(3): 319–326.

Phillips, Jr., K. M. 1973. “Two Archaic Bronzes from Poggio Civitate.” Opuscula Romana 9: 177–182.

Phillips, Jr., K. M. 1974. “Bryn Mawr College Excavations in Tuscany, 1973.” American Journal of Archaeology 78(3): 265–278.

Phillips, Jr., K. M. 1978. “Orientalizing Gem Stones from Poggio Civitate (Murlo, Siena).” La parola del passato 182: 355–369.

Phillips, Jr., K. M. 1980. “The Date of the Architectural Terracottas from Poggio Civitate (Murlo), Siena.” La parole del passato 192/35: 202–206.

Phillips, Jr., K. M. 1983. “Terrecotte architettoniche con protomi di leopardo da Poggio Civitate (Murlo, Siena).” Bollettino d’arte 68: 1-24.

Phillips, Jr., K. M. 1985. “Italic House Models and Etruscan Architectural Terracottas of the Seventh Century B.C. from Acquarossa and Poggio Civitate, Murlo.” Analecta Romana Instituti Danici 14: 7–16.

Phillips, Jr., K. M. 1989. “Greek Objects at Poggio Civitate.” Analecta Romana Instituti Danici 17-18: 29–42.

Phillips, Jr., K. M. 1990. “The Lateral Sima from Poggio Civitate (Murlo): Notes on Early Etruscan Craftsmanship.” Opuscula Romana 18: 139–157.

Rathje, A. 2004. “Murlo, Images, and Archaeology.” Etruscan Studies 10(1): 175–184.

Root, M. C. 1973. “An Etruscan Horse Race from Poggio Civitate.” American Journal of Archaeology 77(2): 121–137.

Rystedt, E. 1984. “Architectural Terracotta as Aristocratic Display: The Case of Seventh-Century Poggio Civitate (Murlo).” Opuscula Romana 3: 367–375.

Scheffer, C. 1985. “Was There a Garden at Poggio Civitate?” Opuscula Romana 15: 105–108.

Shoe Merrit, L. 1970. “Architectural Mouldings from Murlo.” Studi Etruschi 38: 13–25.

Small, J. P. 1971. “The Banquet Frieze from Poggio Civitate (Murlo).” Studi Etruschi 39: 25–61.

Tobin-Dodd, F. 2019. “Standing Spouted Funnels from Poggio Civitate (Murlo).” Studi Etruschi 81: 73–83.

Thuillier, J.-P. 1980. “A propos des ‘Triades Divines’ de Poggio Civitate (Murlo).” Centre de recherches d'histoire et de philologie de la IVe Section de l’ecole pratique des hautes études, III Hautes etudes du monde gréco-romain 10: 385-394.

Tuck, A. 1994. “The Etruscan Seated Banquet: Villanovan Ritual and Etruscan Iconography.” American Journal of Archaeology 98 (4): 617–28.

Tuck, A. 1999. “Orientalizing Period Wing-Handle Cups from Poggio Civitate: Ceramic Traditions and Regional Production in Inland Etruria.” Etruscan Studies 6: 85–108.

Tuck, A. 2000. “Architecture and Community at Poggio Civitate.” Etruscan Studies 7: 109–112.

Tuck, A. with J. Bauer, K. Kreindler, T. Huntsman, S. Miller, S. Pancaldo, and C. Powell. 2009. “Center and Periphery in Inland Etruria: Poggio Civitate and the Etruscan Settlement in Vescovado di Murlo.” Etruscan Studies 12: 215–237.

Tuck, A. with J. Brunk, T. Huntsman, and H. Tallman. 2010. “An Archaic Period Well from Poggio Civitate: Thoughts on the Final Destruction of the Site.” Etruscan Studies 13: 93–104.

Tuck, A. 2014. “Manufacturing at Poggio Civitate: Elite Consumption and Social Organization in the Etruscan Seventh Century.” Etruscan Studies 17(2): 121–139.

Tuck, A. 2015. “2014 Excavations at Poggio Civitate.” Etruscan Studies 18(1): 28–39.

Tuck, A. 2016. “Scavi a Poggio Civitate e Vescovado di Murlo.” Notiziario della Soprintendenza Archeologia della Toscana 2: 349–362.

Tuck, A. 2017. “The Evolution and Political Use of Elite Domestic Architecture at Poggio Civitate (Murlo).” Journal of Roman Archaeology 30(1): 227–243.

Tuck, A. and A. Glennie. 2020. “The Archaic Aristocracy: The Case of Murlo (Poggio Civitate).” Annali della Fondazione per il Museo ‘Claudio Faina’ 27: 515–542.

Tuck, A., A. Glennie, K. Kreindler, E. O’Donoghue, and C. Polsini. 2016. “2015 Excavations at Poggio Civitate and Vescovado di Murlo (Provincia di Siena).” Etruscan Studies 19(1): 87–148.

Tuck, A., S. Kansa, K. Kreindler, and E. O’Donoghue. 2017. “2016 Excavations at Poggio Civitate and Vescovado di Murlo.” Etruscan Studies 20(1): 35–57.

Tuck, A., K. Kreindler, and T. Huntsman. 2013. “Excavations at Poggio Civitate (Murlo) during the 2012-2013 Seasons: Domestic Architecture and Selected Finds from the Civitate A Property Zone.” Etruscan Studies 16: 287–306.

Tuck, A. and E. O. Nielsen. 2008. “Chronological Implications of Relief Ware Bucchero at Poggio Civitate.” Etruscan Studies 11: 49–66.

Tuck, A. and R. Wallace. 2011. “An Inscribed Rocchetto from Poggio Civitate (Murlo).” Studi Etruschi 74: 197–202.

Tuck, A. and R. Wallace. 2012. “A ‘New’ Inscribed Plaque from Poggio Civitate (Murlo).” Etruscan Studies 15(1): 1-17.

Tuck, A. and R. Wallace. 2012 . “The Social Context of Proto-Literacy in Central Italy: The Case of Poggio Civitate.” The Accordia Research Papers 12: 57–68.

Tuck, A. and R. Wallace. 2013. “Letters and Non-Alphabetic Characters on Roof Tiles from Poggio Civitate (Murlo).” Etruscan Studies 16(2): 210–262.

Tuck, A. and R. Wallace. 2018. “A Third Inscribed Kyathos Fragment from Poggio Civitate.” Mitteilungen des Deutschen Archäologischen Instituts, Römische Abteilung 124: 301-309.

Tuck, A. and R. Wallace. 2018. "An Umbrian Inscription at Poggio Civitate (Murlo)." Glotta 94: 273–282.

Turfa, J. M., and A. G. Steinmayer. 2002. “Interpreting Early Etruscan Structures: The Question of Murlo. Papers of the British School at Rome 70: 1-28.

Wallace, R. 2006. “Etruscan Inscription on Fragments of Bucchero Kyathoi Recovered at Poggio Civitate.” Studi Etruschi 72: 189–197.

Wallace, R. 2008. “Etruscan Inscriptions on Ivory Objects Recovered from the Orientalizing Period Residence at Poggio Civitate (Murlo).” Etruscan Studies 11: 67–80.

Wallace, R. 2008. “Muluvanice Inscriptions at Poggio Civitate (Murlo).” American Journal of Archaeology 112(3): 449–458.

Wallace, R. 2010. “Alphabet, Orthography, and Paleography at Poggio Civitate (Murlo).” Etruscan Studies 13: 109–121.

Warden, P. G. 1977. “A Decorated Terracotta Stand from Poggio Civitate (Murlo).” Mitteilungen des Deutschen Archäologischen Instituts, Römische Abteilung 84: 199–210.

Warden, P. G. 1982. “An Etruscan Bronze Group.” American Journal of Archaeology 86(2): 233-238

Warden, P. G., R. Maddin, T. Stech, and J. D. Muhly. 1982. “Copper and Iron Production at Poggio Civitate (Murlo): Analysis of Metalworking By-products from an Archaic Etruscan Site.” Expedition 25(1): 26–36.

Warden, P. G., R. Maddin, T. Stech, and J. D. Muhly. 1991. “Analyses of Metalworking By-Products from Poggio Civitate (Murlo).” Studi e Materiali 6: 151–156.

Winter, N. 1977. “Architectural Terracottas with Human Heads from Poggio Civitate (Murlo).” Archeologia Classica, 29(1): 17–34.

Winter, N. A. 2019. “Finding a Home for a Roof in Production within the Building History of Poggio Civitate (Murlo). Etruscan Studies 22(1-2): 65-94.

=== Dissertations and Theses ===
Christensen, A. M. 1997. “The Glass Finds from Poggio Civitate (Murlo).” M.A. diss., Florida State University.

Edlund-Gantz, I. 1971. “The Seated Statues from Poggio Civitate (Murlo).” Ph.D. diss., Bryn Mawr College.

Moore, D. W. 2011. “Earthen Architecture and Technological Change at Poggio Civitate.” Ph.D. diss., The University of North Carolina at Chapel Hill.

Newland, D. 1994. “The Akroterial Sculpture and Architectural Terracottas from the Upper Building at Murlo.” Ph.D. diss., Bryn Mawr College.

Nielsen, E. O. 1974. “The Murlo Ivories.” Ph.D. diss., Bryn Mawr College.

Tuck, A. 1996. “Burials from Poggio Aguzzo: The Necropolis of Poggio Civitate (Murlo).” Ph.D. diss., Brown University.
