= Murlo cowboy =

Architectural ornament

The “Murlo Cowboy” is a terracotta acroterial sculpture that is part of over a dozen sculptures, discovered in the ruins of the Archaic Building at the Etruscan archaeological site at Murlo in the Province of Siena, Tuscany, Italy during the sixth century BCE. On Etruscan buildings, statues of gods, heroes, and ancestors were often placed on the ridges of roofs to protect votive offerings. This protective concept dates back to Etruscan beliefs from the preceding Orientalizing Period.

== Archaic building ==
The Archaic Building was a colossal 61x 61-meter complex, constructed at the beginning of the 6th century BCE, that seems to have been used for various purposes. The building was partly constructed using the remaining debris from a previous complex in the same location. On top of the roof of this immense building sat numerous terracotta acroteria, including the “Murlo Cowboy”. It is believed that the building, and its decoration, were destroyed at some point later in the sixth century BCE.

== Excavation ==
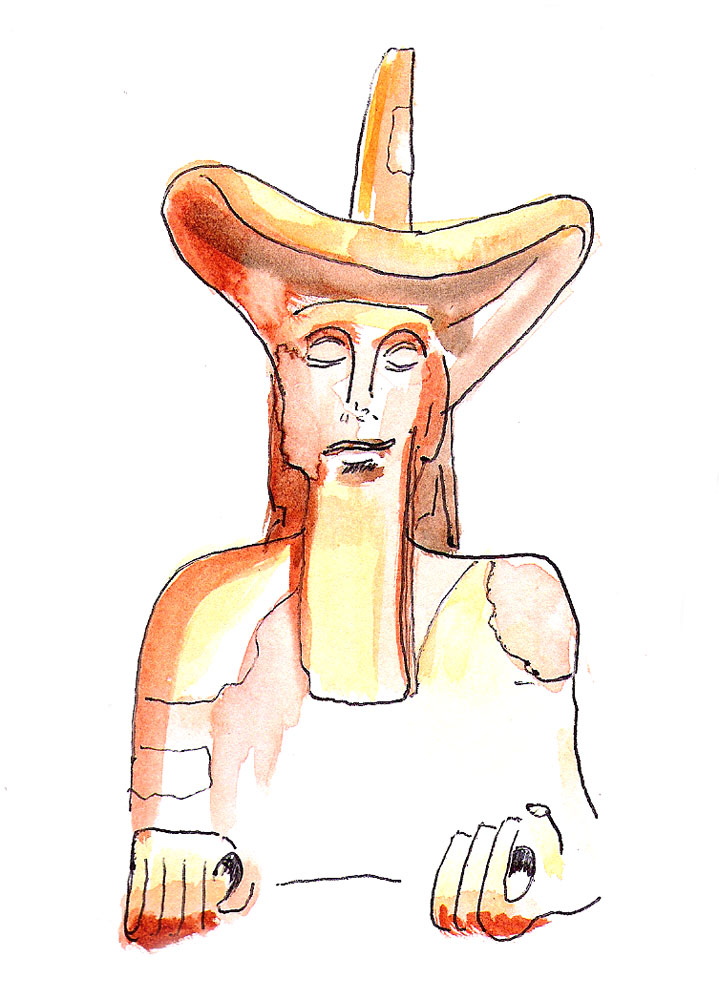
Artist's impression of the Murlo cowboy.

Through the excavation of the Poggio Civitate site, archaeologists have discovered the remains to twenty seated, one running, and three standing akroteria. Included in these findings is the famed “Murlo Cowboy” akroteria.

Today, the clay statue is on display at a museum containing recovered artifacts, from the Poggio Civitate site, located in Murlo, Italy.

== Characteristics of the Murlo Cowboy ==
The major piece of the group is a seated terracotta statue with a wide brimmed hat, reminiscent of a cowboy hat, known as the Murlo Cowboy. The statue is approximately 1.5 meters tall. The bold facial expressions are representative of Archaic Greek Sculpture, as the eyes and lips appear to be protruding from the face. It is believed that the distinct facial features allow visitors to see them from afar, allowing for the statue to carry out its protective duties. The statue probably represents a haruspex.

There have been similar akroteria discovered at nearby sites around Murlo that replicate the Murlo Cowboy.
