= Women in Etruscan society =

Overview of women in Etruscan civilization

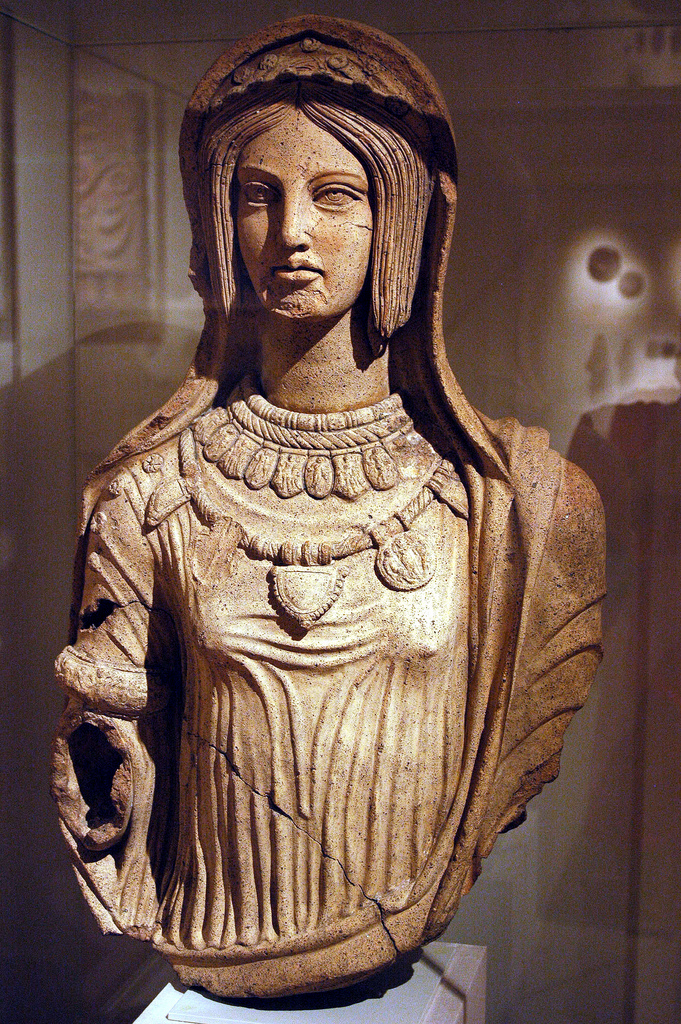
Etruscan woman in terracotta, 74.8 cm (5th and 2nd centuries BC) Metropolitan Museum of Art.

Women were respected in Etruscan society compared to their ancient Greek and Roman counterparts. Today only the status of aristocratic women is known because no documentation survives about women in other social classes.

Women's role and image evolved during the millennium of the Etruscan period. Affluent women were well-groomed and lived a family life within society, where their role was important both politically and administratively. Tanaquil and Velia Spurinna were among the women who played leading roles in Etruscan politics. In the late phase of Etruscan history, women lost much of their independence amidst conquest by the Roman Republic, and their status became that of Roman women.

== Women and Etruscan society ==
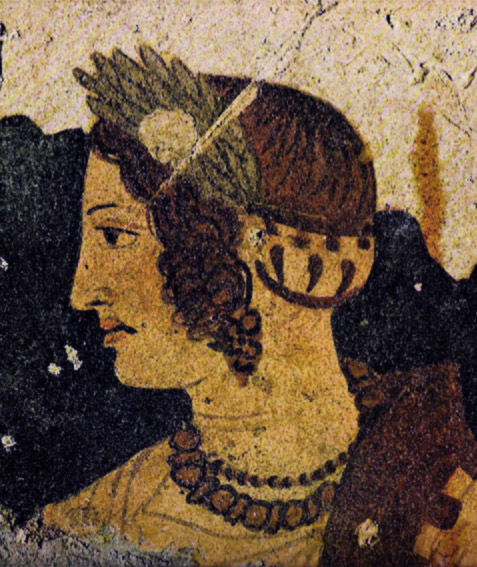
Velia Spurinna: fresco of the Tomba dell'Orco.

Etruscan women were politically important, and dominant in family and social life. Their status in Etruscan civilization differed from their Greek and the Roman peers, who were considered to be marginal and secondary in relation to men.

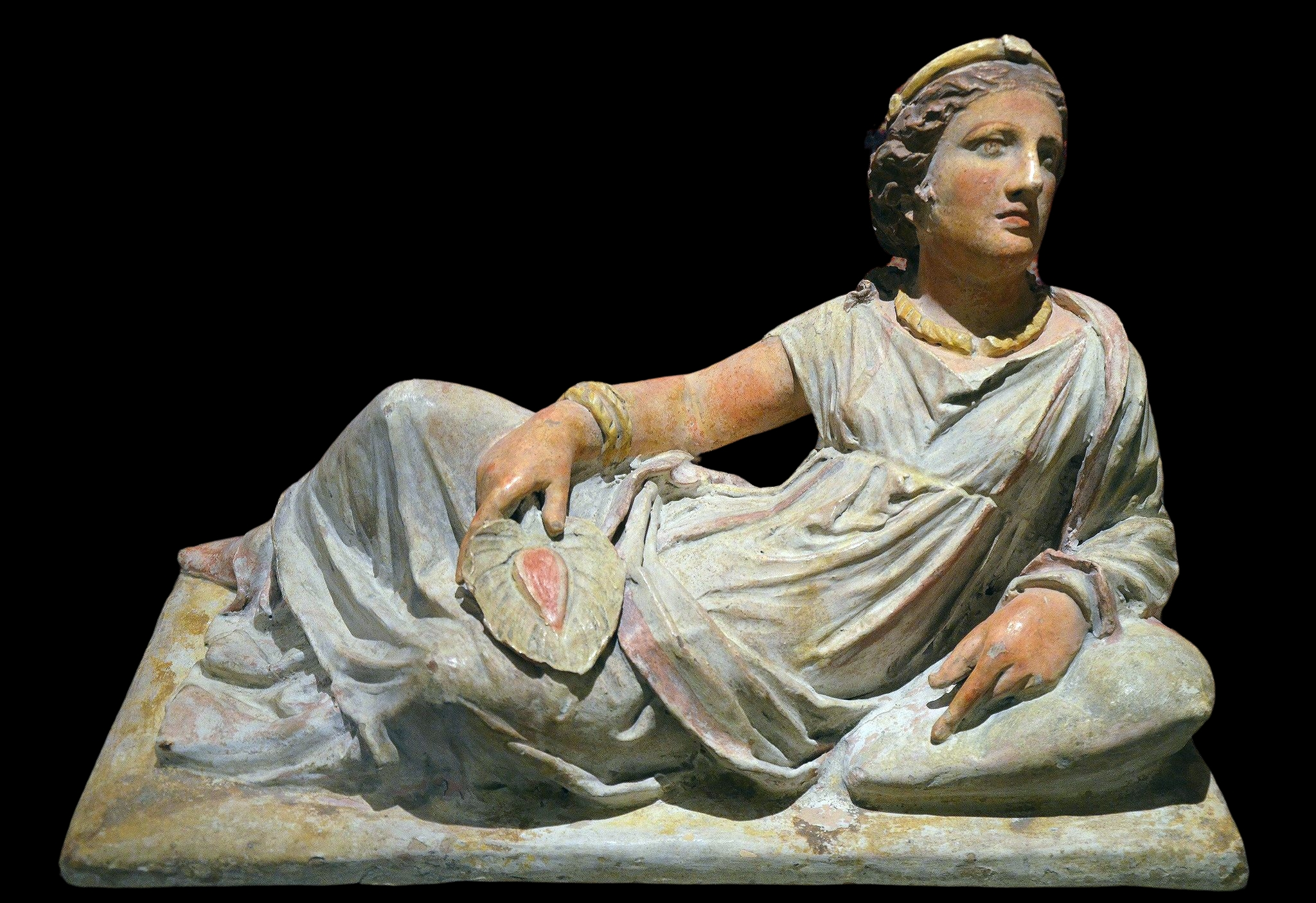
Etruscan woman, painted terracotta statue, 1st century BC, found at Chiusi, preserved in the Badisches Landesmuseum in Karlsruhe

Ancient writers like Livy and Pliny the Elder attest to the influence of women such as Tanaquil and Velia Spurinna. Livy describes the decisive role played by Tanaquil, the wife of Lucius Tarquinius Priscus. She predicted her husband's success and protected Roman royalty after his assassination. At the beginning of the first century, Claudius took as his first wife Plautia Urgulanilla, an Etruscan. Pliny refers to Tanaquil as a model of womanly virtue.

Contemporary images of Etruscan women often show them wearing rich attire. Archaeological pieces found in the tombs, such as frescoes, sarcophagi, urns, and funerary possessions testify to the importance of women in society. The spindle whorl and spring scale discovered in the tombs of Etruscan women show that they also practiced manual work, such as spinning and weaving. They participated in banquets, physical exercises, and attended games in which naked athletes participated; and generally could enjoy public life without being stigmatized by men. On occasion, women presided over events from a privileged platform, as shown on the fresco of Orvieto or the plaque of Murlo. In addition they could own property under their name, manage their homes, and conduct trade. On the frescoes of the Tomba delle Bighe, noble men and women mingle in the same bleachers.

On funerary urns and on the lids of sarcophagi, they appear as they were in daily life, without retouching, their faces often marked by wrinkles and their bodies showing aging, testifying to a strong character. (Note: Reproduction of physical flaws such as the one at the Guarnacci Museum in Volterra.) This type of representation is practically unique in the ancient world, where women were limited to their role as wives, mothers or concubines.

Etruscologist Jacques Heurgon quotes the anecdote reported by Livy of a woman who despises her sister because "she lacks muliebris audacia", that is to say, the energy and ambition that seem characteristic of Etruscan women. Sybille Haynes studied small bronze sculptures, the oldest of which shows women and men lying in a triclinium, raising the drinking cup; but in the most recent examples, they are sitting next to the husband lying down. Between the two series, the Romans changed the status of women in the Etruscan society through Romanization.

== The evolution of women's status by period ==
The characteristics of Etruscan women depended on their social rank, the place where they lived, and the period concerned. The Etruscan world cannot be considered as a homogeneous whole from the social, political, and economic points of view. It is nevertheless possible to highlight in general terms the main characteristics by examining the information and clues that have emerged during archaeological research, comparing them whenever possible with ancient texts.

=== Villanovan period ===
During the Villanovan period (9th – 8th century BC), parity between men and women seems to have been the rule. The unity of burials between the unmarried couple is evidenced by burial trousseaux of the period, shows no class differences or dominant personalities or families. The presence of characteristic status symbols, such as weapons for men and spindle whorls, weights, mirrors, and crockery for women, seems to indicate a clear separation of the fields of competence attributed to the two sexes, the status of warrior-farmer for men and the organization of the home for women.

However, even in burials of this early period, exceptions have been identified: some burials have both types of characteristic status symbols or neither. Therefore, the original belief that Villanovan Etruscan women were weavers while Villanovan Etruscan men were warriors may not be entirely true.

=== Orientalizing period ===
During the Orientalizing period (approximately 750 to 500 BC, definitions differ), wealth was monopolized by a small number of individuals, revealing social differences, with hereditary transmission that does not seem to mark any distinction between the sexes. Women and men were equally wealthy in their burial trousseaux, as demonstrated by the findings of the Regolini-Galassi tomb in Cerveteri and tombs 2 and 11 of the necropolis of Banditella.

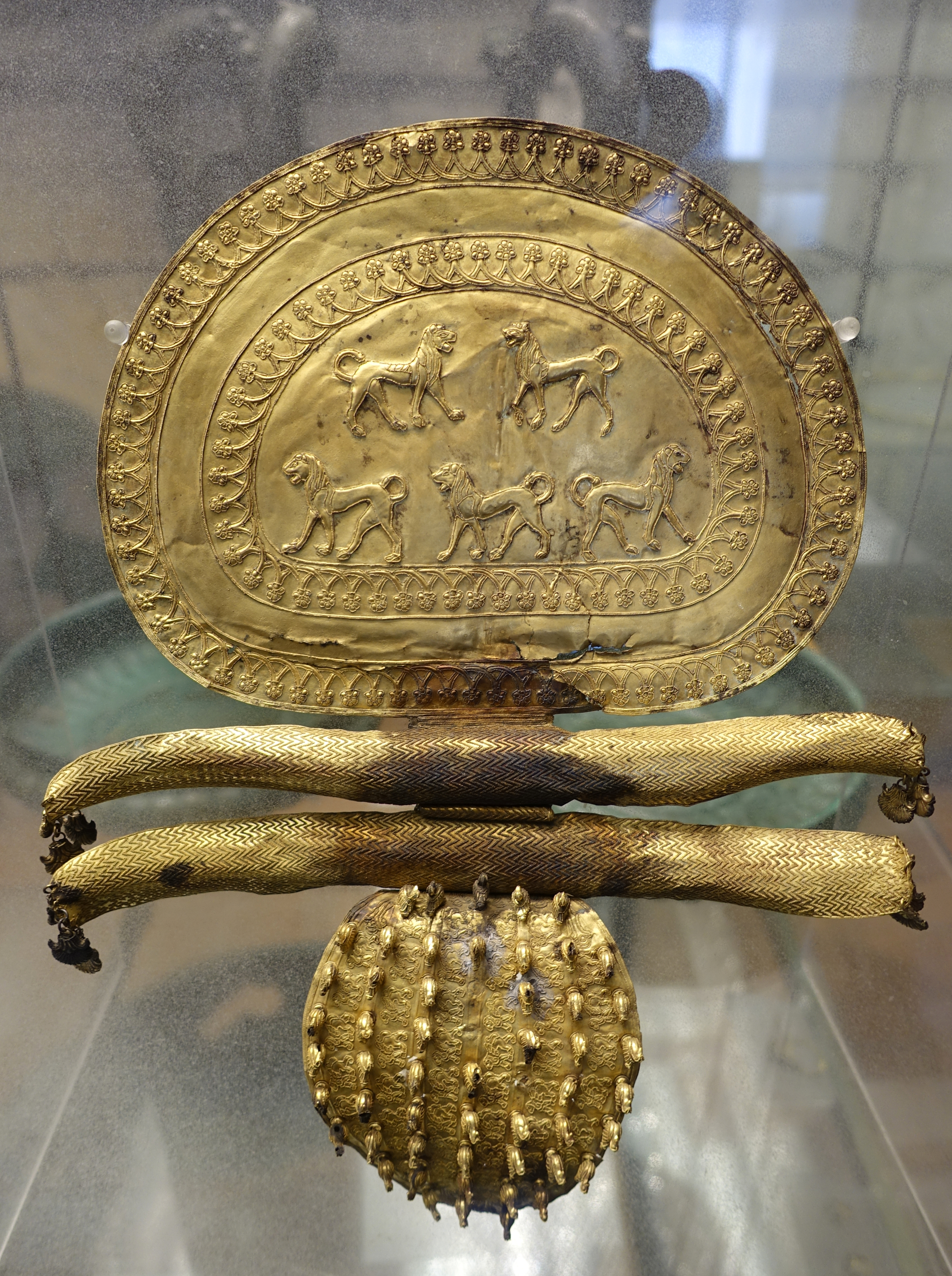
Gold fibula, Regolini-Galassi tomb (675–650 BC)

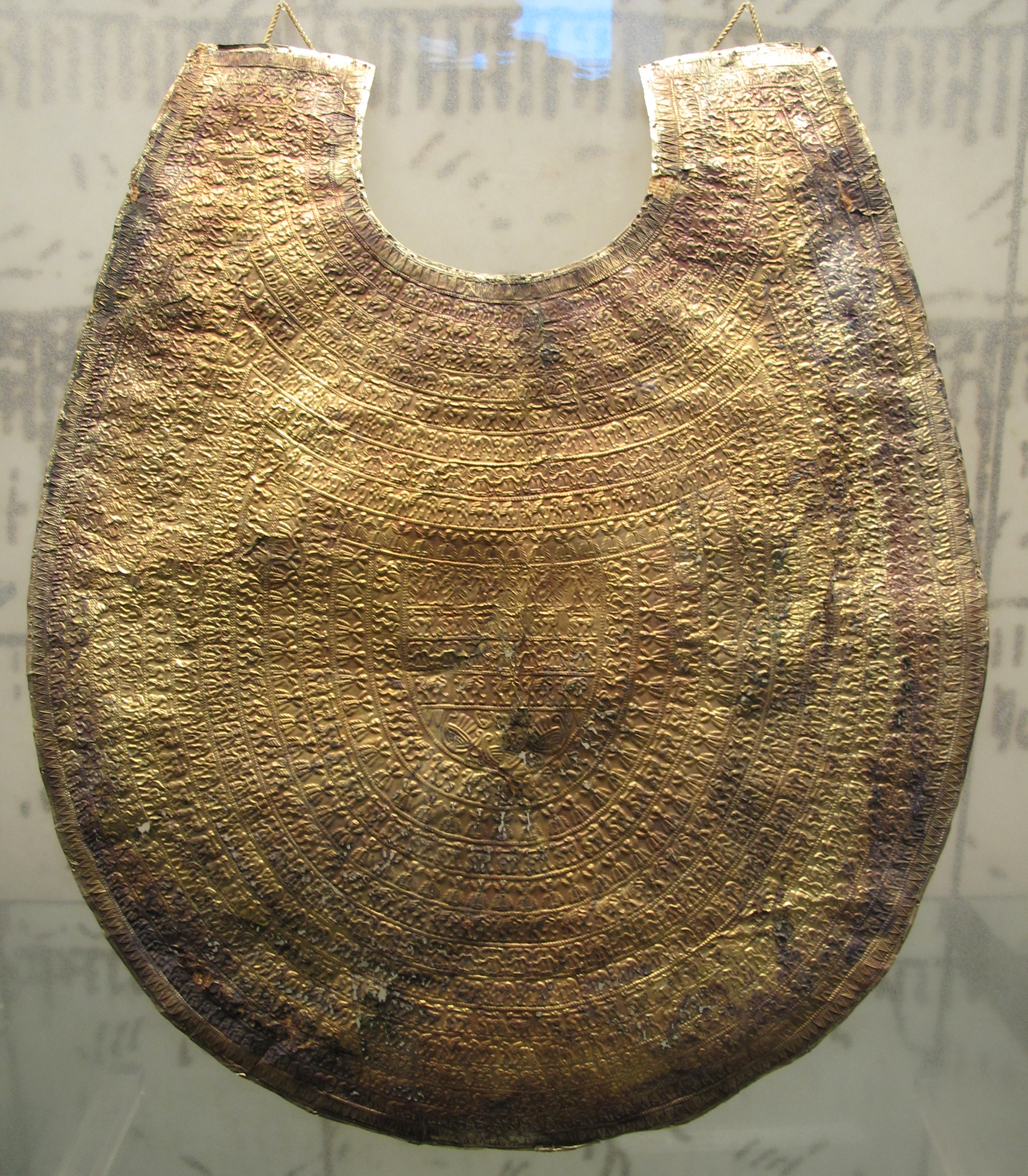
Gold-leaf pectoral, Regolini-Galassi tomb

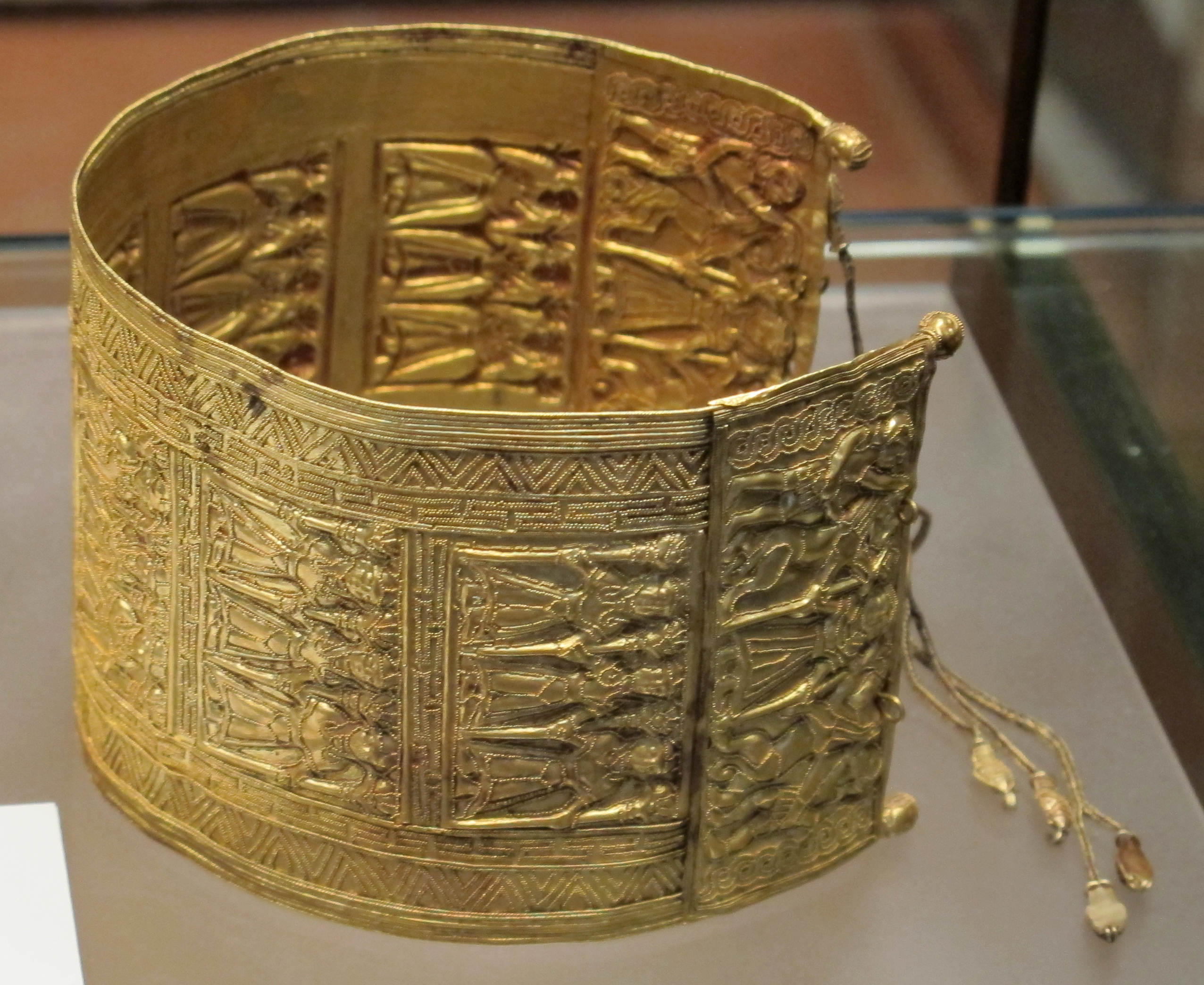
Gold bracelet, Regolini-Galassi tomb

=== Archaic period ===
The Archaic period (580 to 480 BC) highlights women's status in marriage, as evidenced by the Sarcophagus of the Spouses (530 BC, Museum of Villa Giulia). The frescoes of the tombs of Tarquinia (6th – 5th century BC) confirm the presence of women in social spaces (banquets and sports), which among the Greeks were reserved exclusively for men. But their participation and representation in these events do not seem to confirm Theopompus' claim of women's immorality. Indeed, the frescoes that show couples of spouses, highlight strong monogamous couples. The sarcophagi of semi-lying couples of Vulci (fourth century BC) seem to confirm this fact. Nevertheless, women appear in artistic representations on Attic vases dancing totally naked on an equal footing with men, and tomb frescoes reveal, as in the Tomb of the Bulls, daring erotic scenes showing a woman with several partners, or participating in complicated sexual games.

Already in the 7th century BC, Tanaquil, an aristocrat from the city of Tarquinia, was skilled in the art of divination, "like all Etruscans". She urged her husband to leave Etruria and settle in Rome. On the way, she interpreted a prodigy and assured him that he would rule Rome, which happened after the death of Ancus Marcius. When Tarquin the Elder was assassinated, she had her son-in-law Servius Tullius proclaimed king. Historian Alain Hus deduced from these accounts that Etrusca disciplina, the art of interpreting divine signs, was the prerogative of aristocratic families among the Etruscans, and that women could exercise it.

Sarcophagi of spouses

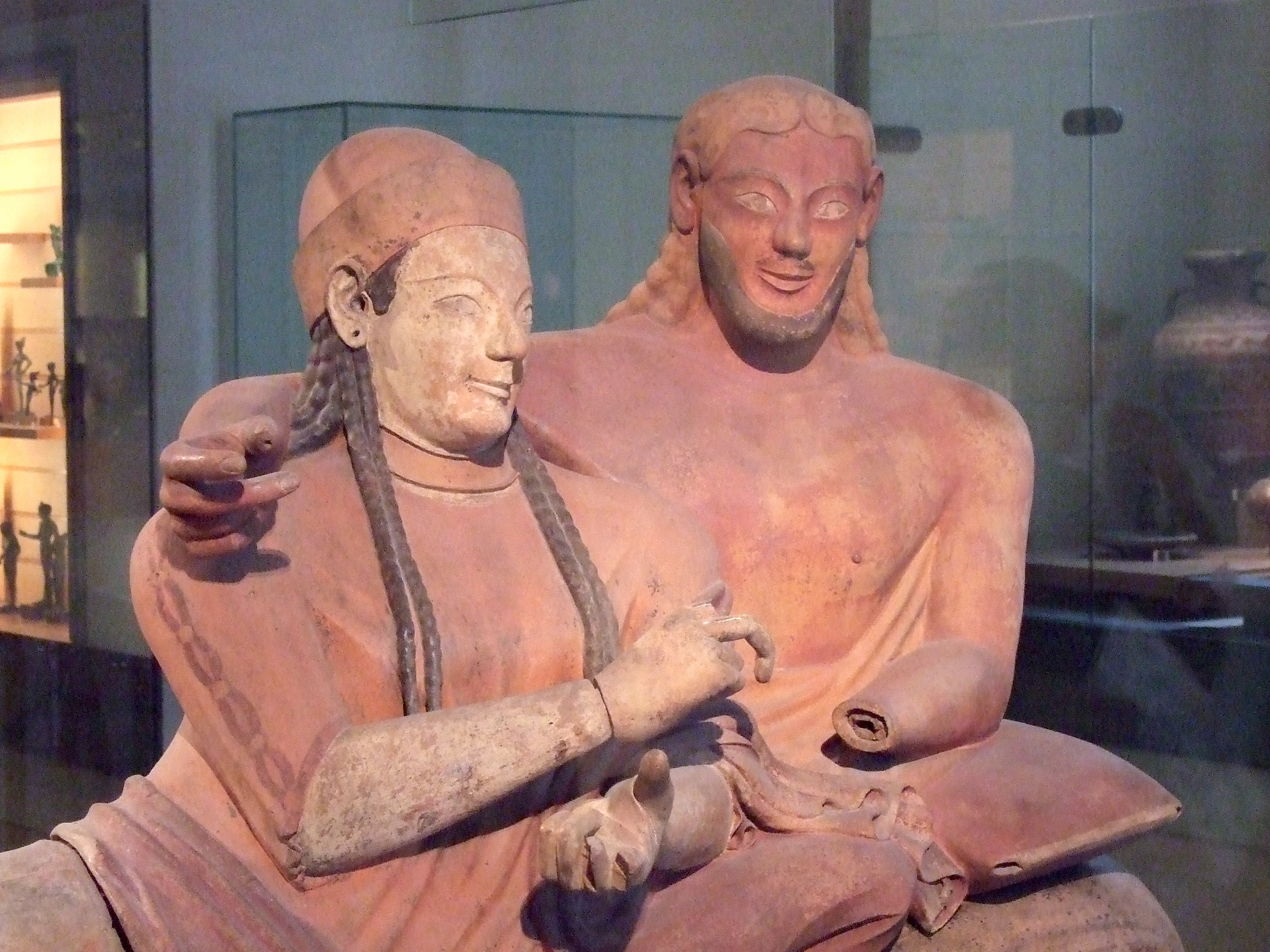
The Sarcophagus of the Spouses (or Cerveteri Sarcophagus) at the Louvre

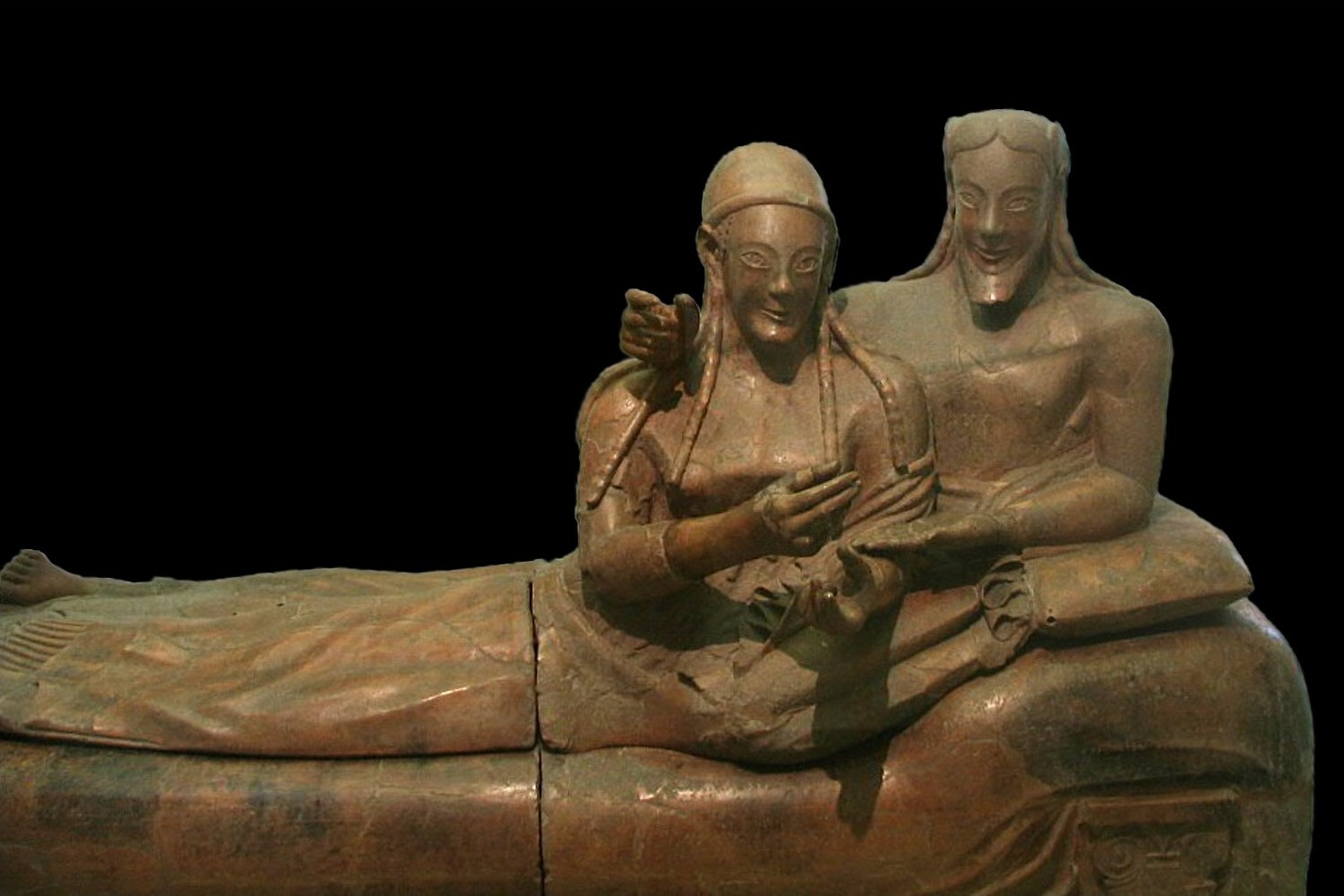
At the National Etruscan Museum in Rome's Villa Giulia

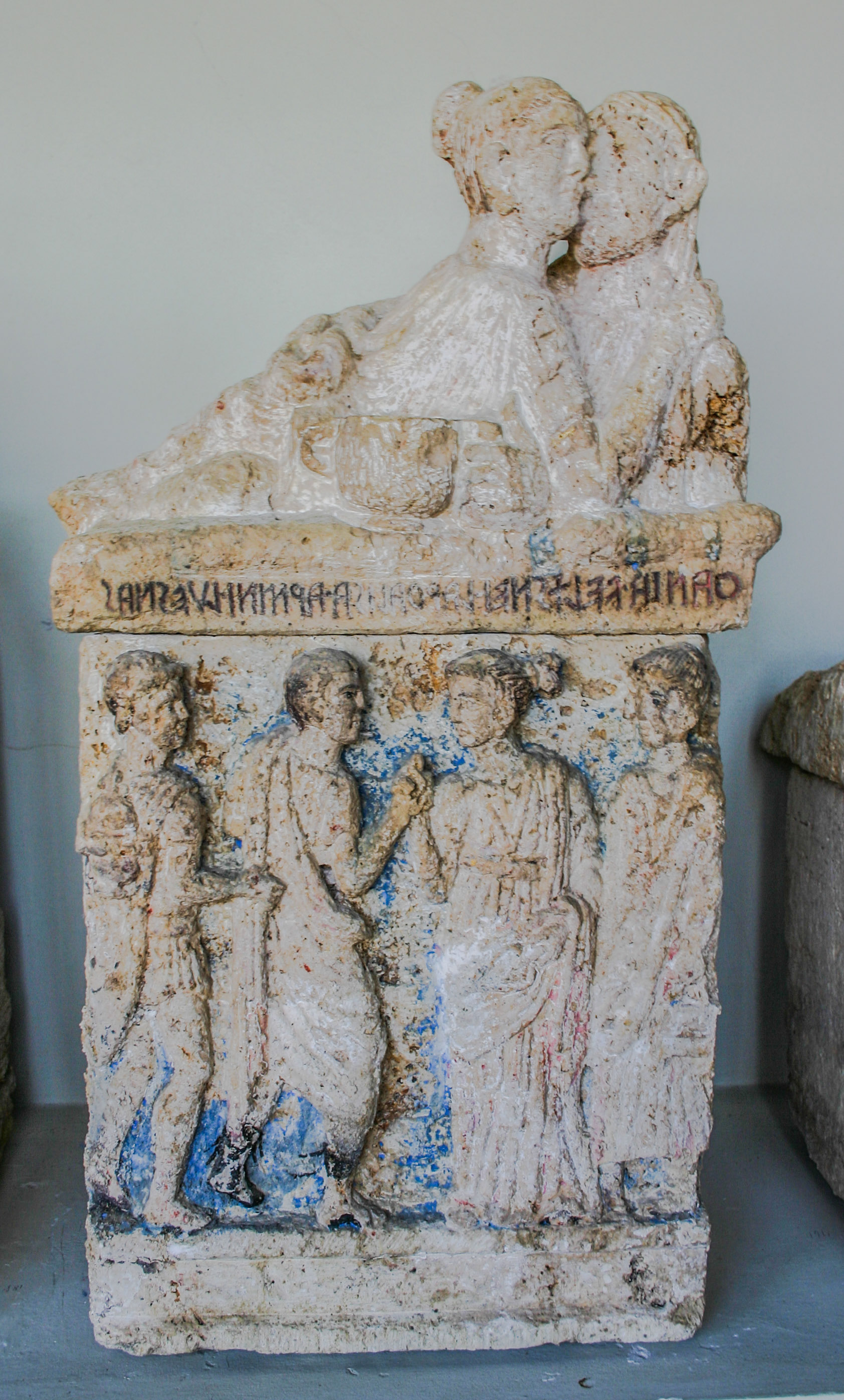
At the National Archaeological Museum of Umbria in Perugia

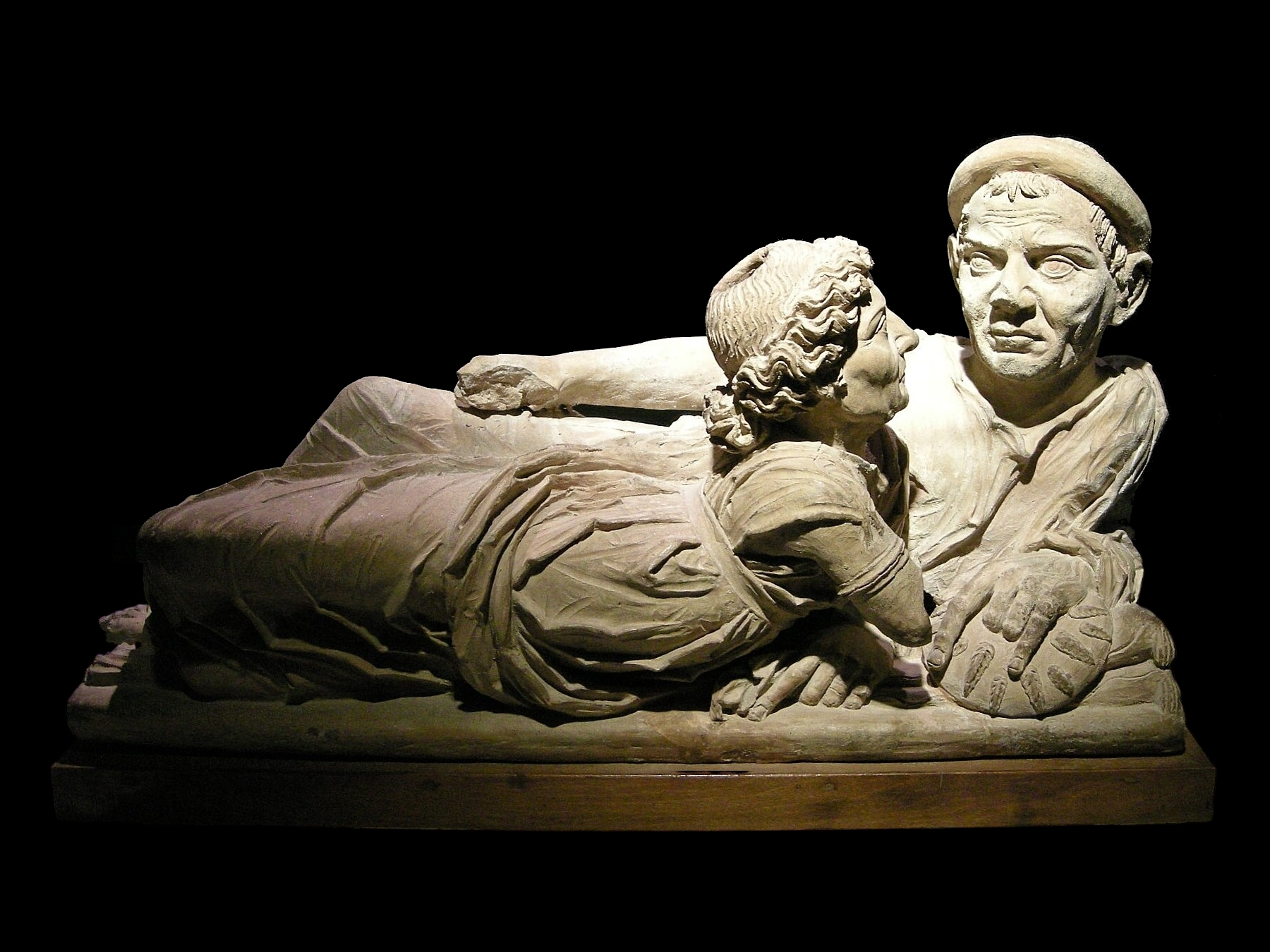
Urna degli Sposi, Guarnacci Etruscan Museum, Volterra

=== Classic period ===
During the Classical period, Etruscan women began to show signs of high rank and esteem. The sarcophagi of Chiusi, the urns of Volterra and the frescoes in tombs confirm the high position reached by women on the social ladder.

In onomastics (of proper names), women's civil status in inscriptions was indicated by their first name, absent in the Latin formulation, and then by their surname, which remained their birth name, even after marriage. In the onomastic formula, the matronymic added to the patronymic became widespread from the 4th century BC onwards, proving the high regard in which the wives' family of origin was held by the Etruscan aristocratic class.

=== Hellenistic period ===
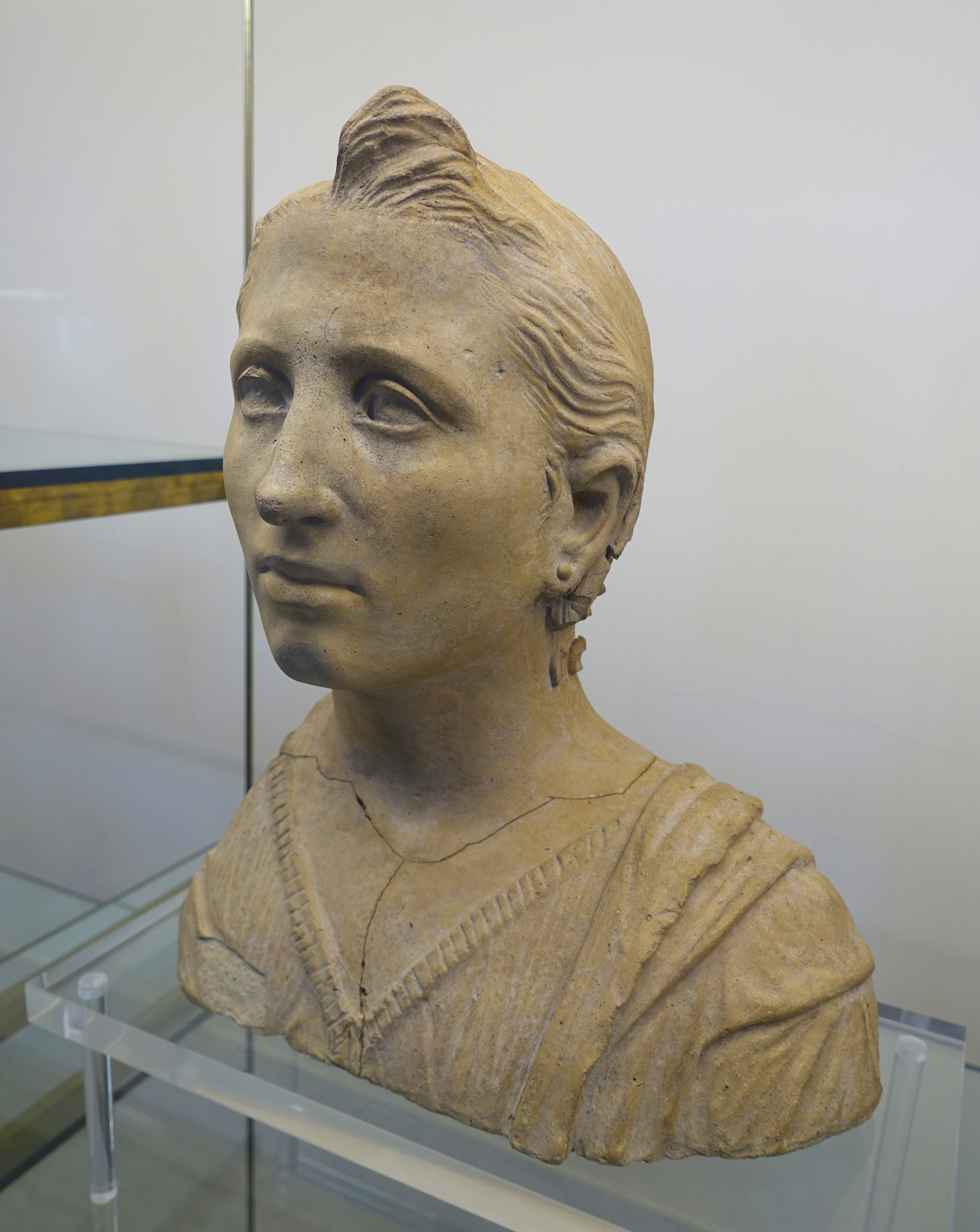
Portrait bust of an Etruscan woman with well-defined features, Cerveteri, 3rd century BC

Romanization began around 340 BC and lasted until the Augustan period, when acculturation led to the final demise of Etruscan political power, as their cultural traits were assimilated by the Romans. Etruscan women lost many of their privileges, and adopted the status of Roman women, who probably also assimilated some of the cultural traits of Etruscan women and gave them a strong influence, such as that exercised by Livia (58 BC – 29 AD), the wife of Augustus, several times regent and advisor to her husband and the most powerful woman in the early Roman Empire. Several women in the imperial family, including Agrippina the Younger, also exerted political influence.

== Women and the family ==
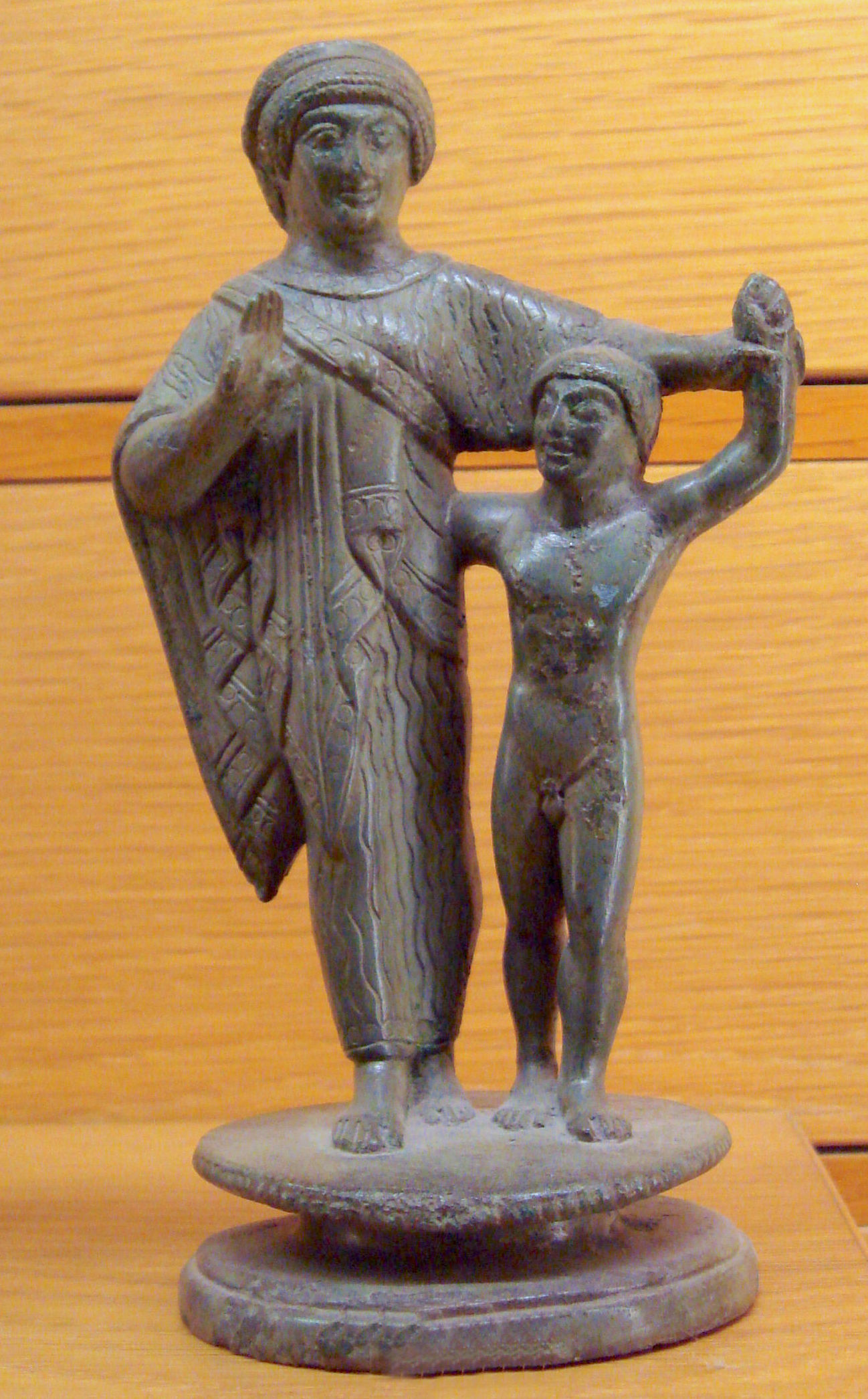
Etruscan mother and child, between 500 and 450 BC. Louvre Museum, Paris.

During banquets women lay on the triclinium next to their husbands, who acknowledged their equal social position in the management of the family patrimony and the upbringing of their children. Together with their fathers, women gave their names to their children (especially among the highest class of society), with funeral epigrams giving priority to the matronymic; women are also referred to by their gens names and with their own first names, affirming their individuality within the family group. Women's proper names frequently engraved on crockery and funerary frescoes include: Ati, Culni, Fasti, Larthia, Ramtha, Tanaquille, Veilia, Velia and Velka. By comparison, in Roman society, women are referred to by a feminized form of their nomen gentilicium: thus, all the women of the Livia gens are called Livia.

== Women's fashion ==
The fashion of Etruscan women changed constantly throughout the different periods, and was often influenced by outside cultures and styles. Women's fashion depicted in Etruscan frescoes and tombs show how aristocratic women dressed.

During the Orientalizing period, Etruscan women wore plaid fabrics, chitons that were 3/4 to full length, with wide belts and back mantles. Their hair was worn in a variety of styles, including back braids, Hathor or Syrian curls, front locks, or single or double curls in front. They were also depicted with conical hats or polos hats, and in sandals.

During the Archaic period, the fashion shifted slightly, with women wearing long chitons with mantles worn over the head. Hair was worn loose, with ringlets, or in the tutulus style. Tutulus was a local style, adapted from the Greeks, where the hair was tied up high in a bun in a conical shape. It was also used by the Romans in later periods. Pointed shoes or slippers and pointed hats were also in fashion.

During the Classical period, long chitons continued to be popular, but pointed shoes were no longer in use. Hair became more relaxed with the krobylos style, where the hair was in a low bun at the nape of the neck.

Loose chitons with high belts and heavy himations were worn during the Hellenistic Period. Shoes and sandals also became popular again.

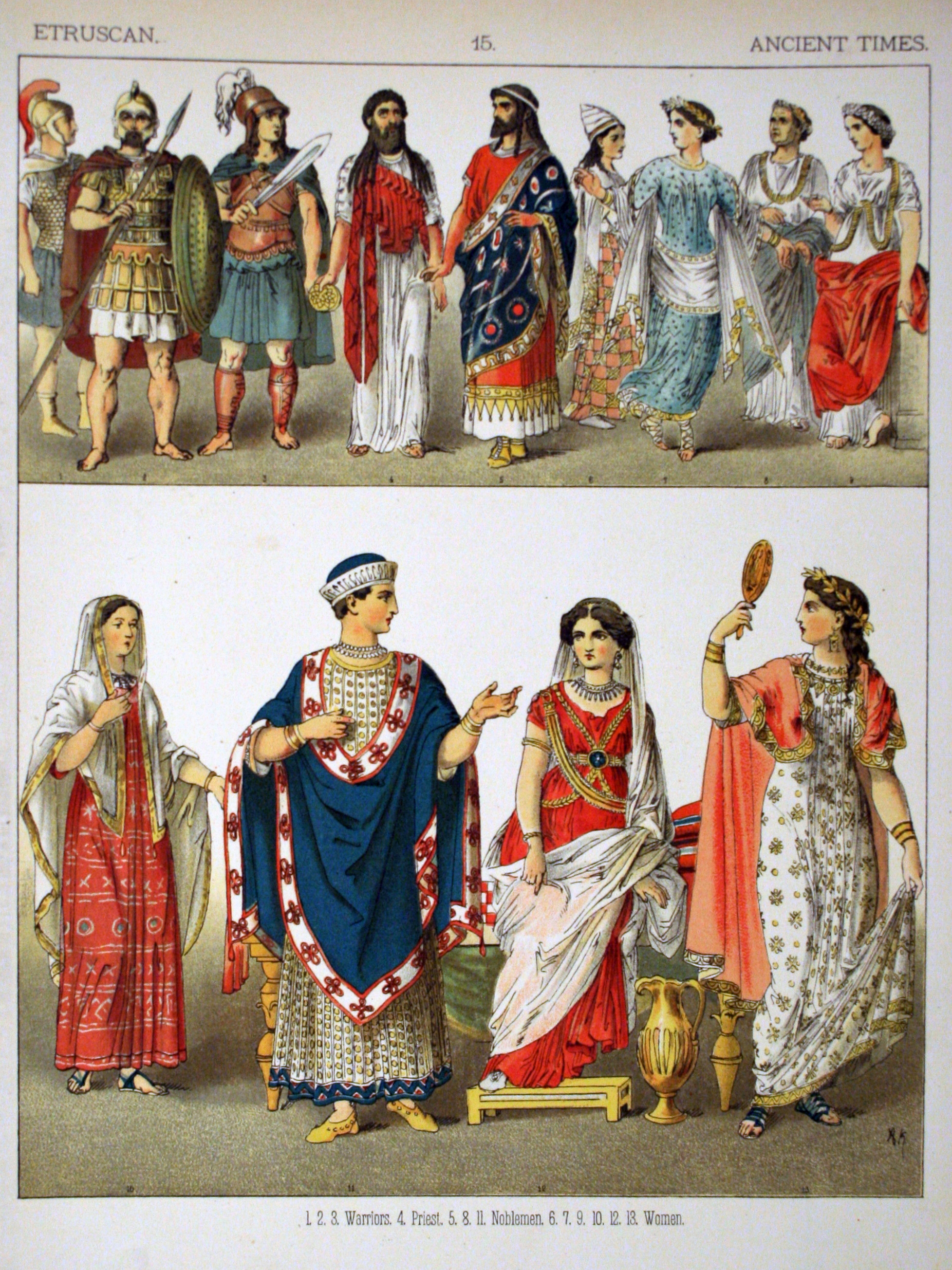
Etruscan Clothing – Costumes of All Nations (1882)

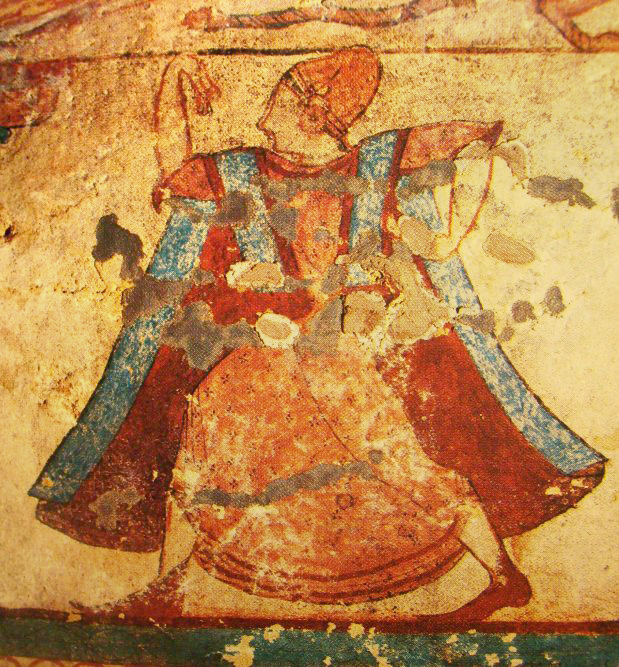
Fresco of the motionless Dancer with large steps carrying the chiton. Tomb of the Lionesses in the Monterozzi necropolis.

== Women's accessories ==
Archaeological findings in burial trousseaux in necropolises, as well as fresco depictions, give a fairly accurate idea of the various accessories used by Etruscan women. Feminine adornment consisted of jewelry, braided gold wire pendants adorned with figurines, palmettes and flowers, necklaces, and precious metal earrings and pins. Etruscan women also had a wide range of refined toiletries at their disposal: ivory, alabaster and glass flasks, containers for ointments or perfumed oils, manicure instruments, engraved mirrors decorated with mythological scenes, featuring a slightly domed reflective surface and a reverse side decorated with incised motifs, bronze storage boxes decorated with engraved scenes, and so on.

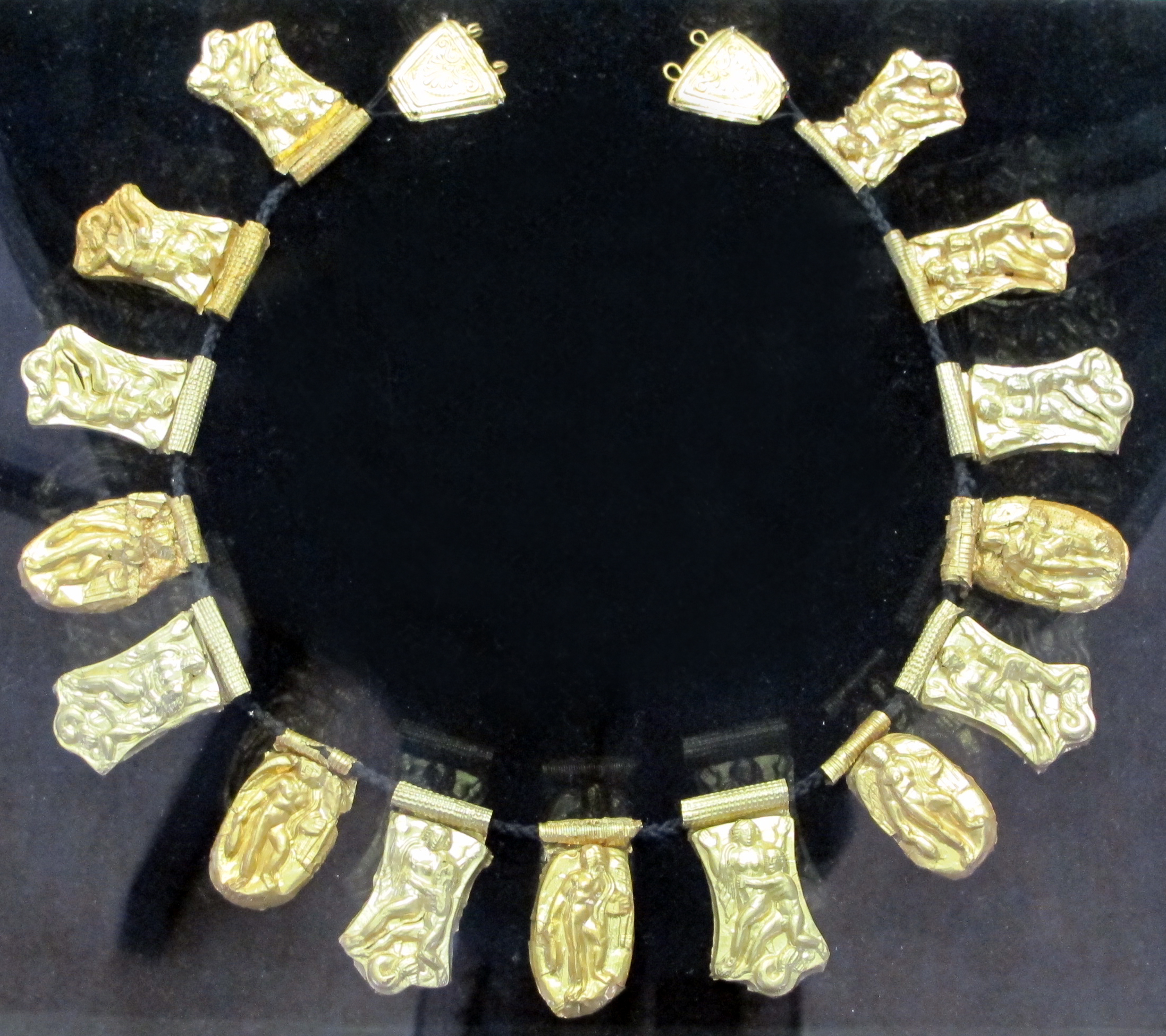
Gold necklace

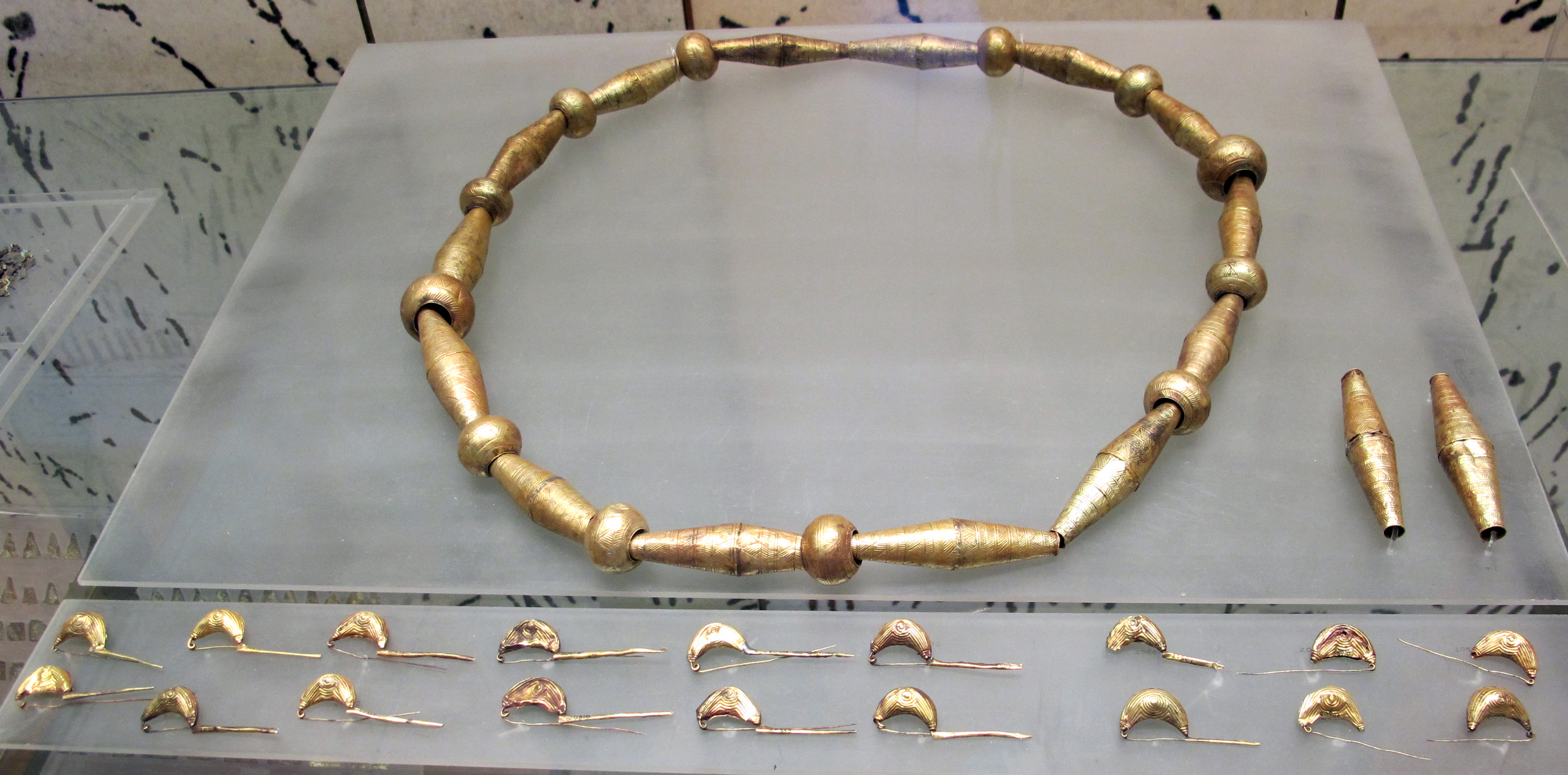
Gold necklace and fibulae (Regolini-Galassi tomb)

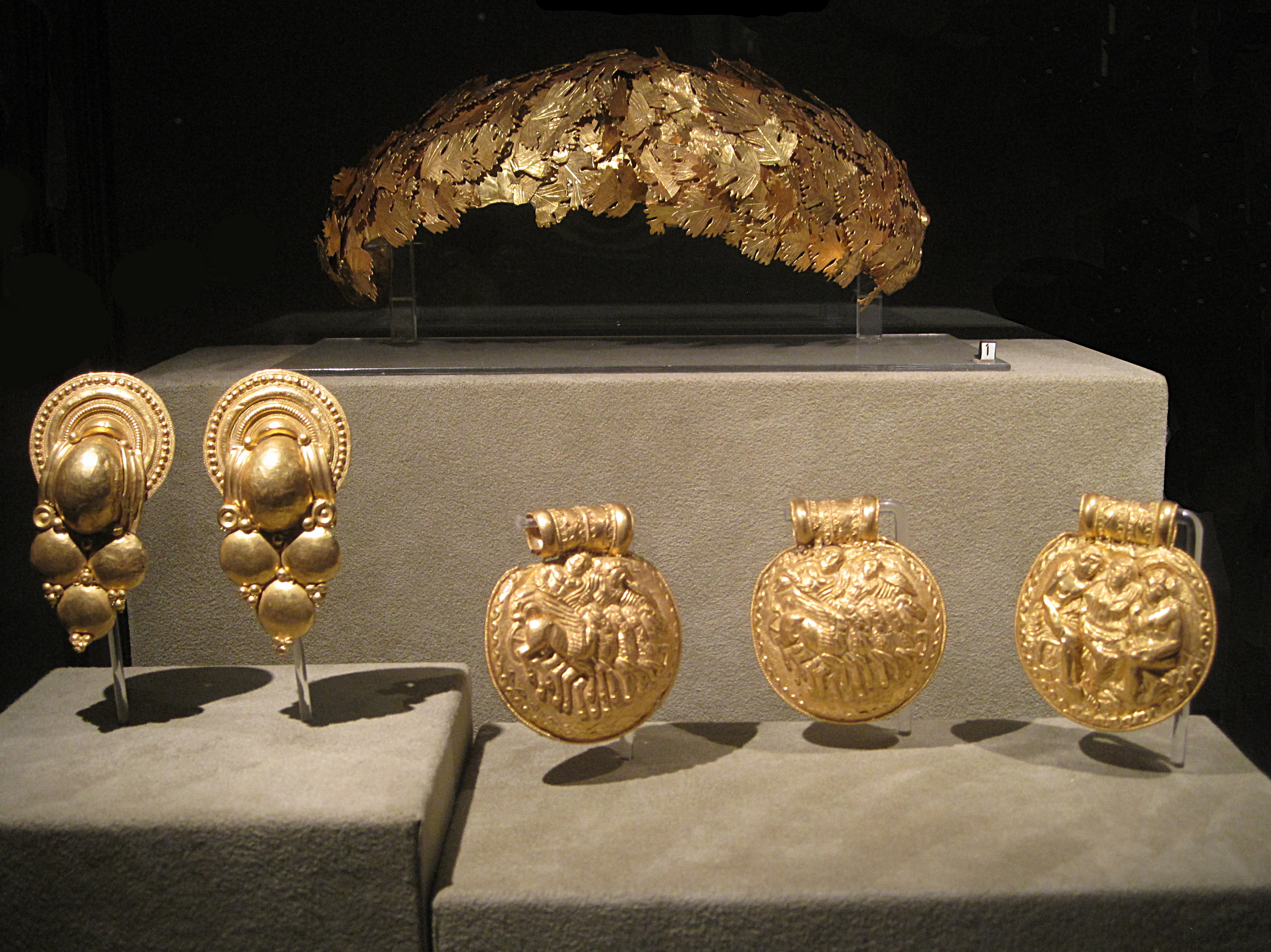
Crown and gold jewelry

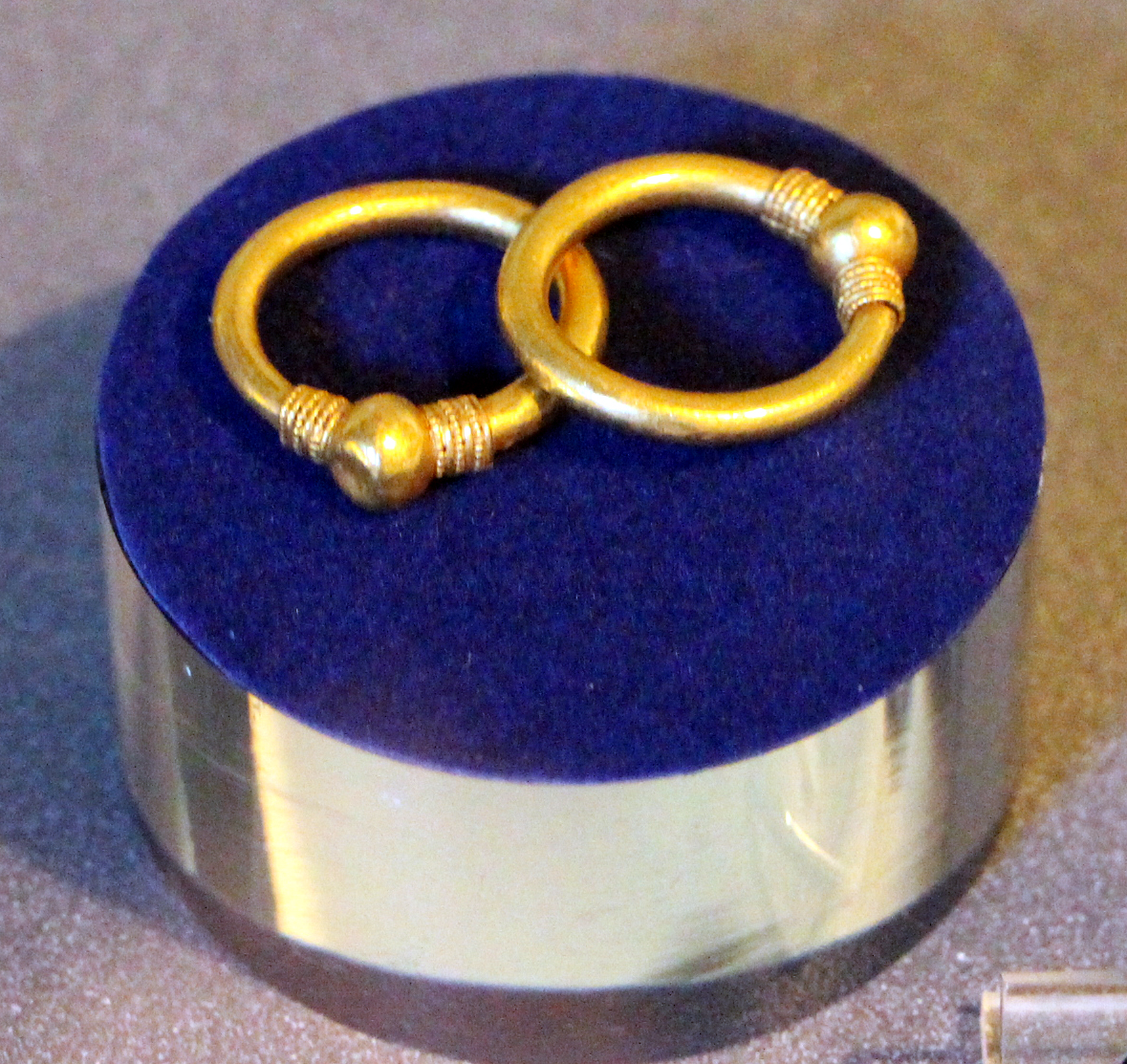
Gold earrings

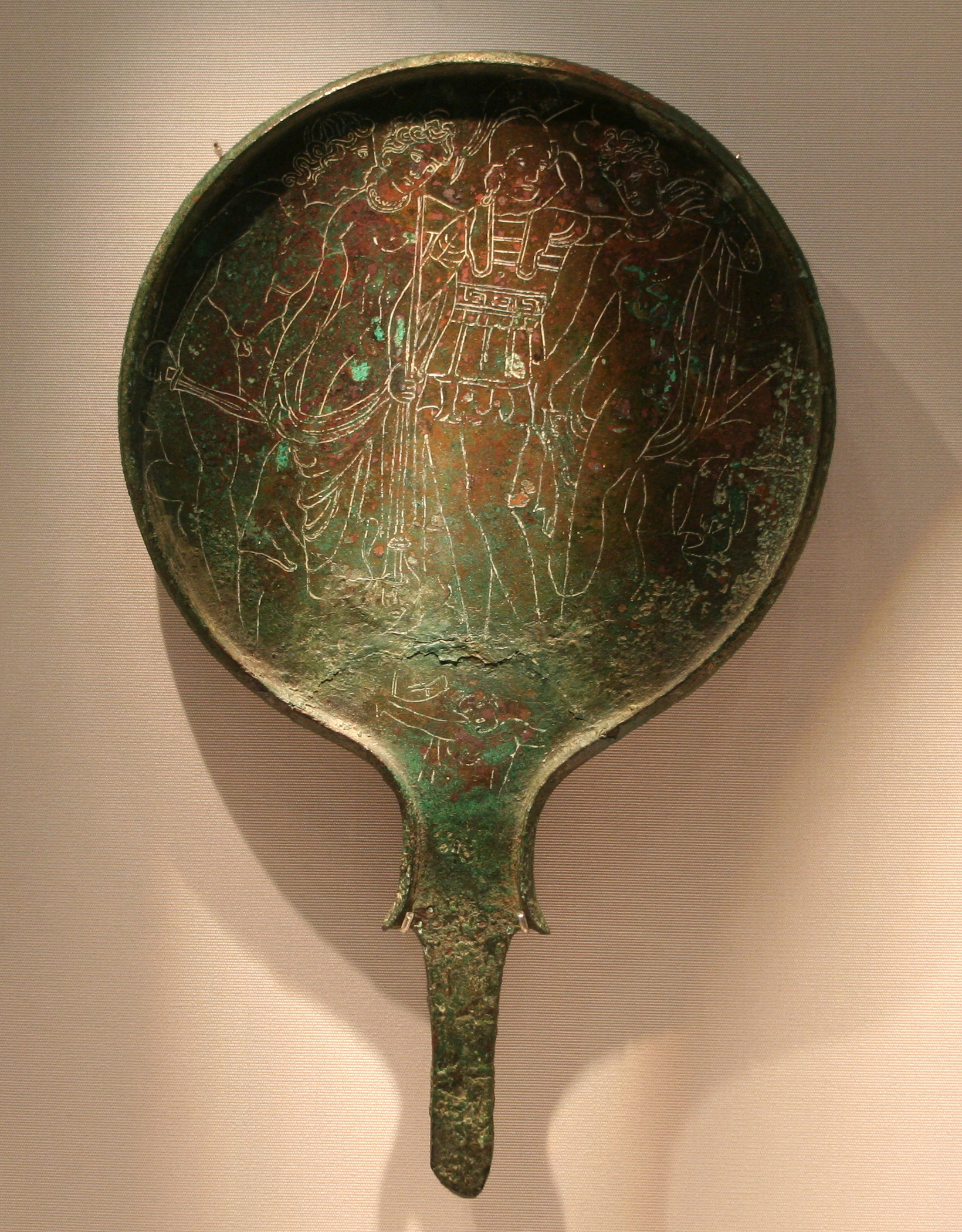
Mirror

== Etruscan women viewed by other civilizations ==
Etruscan women attended banquets alongside men, unlike their Greek contemporaries where democracy was a male-only affair. Greek, and later Roman writers therefore gave Etruscan women a scandalous reputation, although this discredit – the Etruscan truphè – more generally concerned the morals of both sexes.

=== By the Greeks ===
The Etruscan tradition of mixed banqueting was frowned upon by the Greeks, where women lived in the shadows of the home. Greek daughters and wives stayed in their place in the domestic setting, rarely appearing in the community. As direct neighbors of the Etruscans in Magna Graecia (southern Italy), they were familiar with this difference in custom. Theopompus, a Greek historian of the 4th century BC, whom another Roman author, Cornelius Nepos, finds very slanderous, gives a contemptuous description: "Women enjoy all men in complete freedom. In the streets they walk boldly alongside men and dine lying next to them. They have taken great care of their bodies and faces, removing hair from their skin with melted wax and excelling in nudity". "There is no shame," according to Theopompus, "in committing a sexual act in public [...] when they gather with friends, this is what they do: first, when they have finished drinking and are ready for bed and while the torches are still lit, the servants sometimes bring courtesans, sometimes handsome boys and sometimes their own wives [...] Etruscan women make children not knowing who the father is".

=== By the Romans ===
Roman women were considerably more free than Greek women, but the status of Etruscan women was still considered scandalous by the Romans, who often described their behavior as licentious and immoral, comparing them to the musicians and prostitutes of Greek or Roman banquets. Titus Livius contrasted the "virtuous Roman mother" to "Etruscan women lying on their banquet beds".

== See also ==
- Etruscan civilization
- Monterozzi necropolis
- Women in ancient Rome
- Gender roles in the Latial culture
- Etruscan religion
- Daily life of the Etruscans
- List of archaeologically attested women from the ancient Mediterranean region

== Bibliography ==
1. Bonfante, Larissa (1976). Etruscan Dress. Johns Hopkins University Press. p. 256. ISBN 0-8018-1640-8.
2. Briquel, Dominique (2005). Les Étrusques. Paris, Presses Universitaires de France. ISBN 978-2-13-053314-6.
3. Cristofani, Mauro (1985). Dizionario della civiltà etrusca (in Italian). Giunti Editore. p. 108. ISBN 8809217284.
4. Shipley, Lucy (2017). The Etruscans: Lost Civilizations. Reaktion Books. pp. 96–97.
5. Di Giovanni, Ciriaco (2000). La donna etrusca. Bella, sensuale, colta, indipendente. La condizione femminile in Etruria (in Italian). Scipioni. ISBN 88-8364-120-5.
6. Haack, Marie-Laurence (2015). "Les Étrusques dans l'idéologie nationale-socialiste. À propos du Mythe du xxe siècle d'Alfred Rosenberg". Revue Historique (in French). 673 (673): 149–170. doi:10.3917/rhis.151.0149.
7. Fiordelisi, Massimiliano (2015). La civilta' degli Etruschi a colori (in Italian). ISBN 978-1-326-37799-1.
8. Liébert, Yves (2006). Regards sur la truphè étrusque (in French). Limoges, Pulim. ISBN 2-84287-411-0. Archived from the original on 2007-06-15.
9. Rallo, Antonia (1989). Le Donne in Etruria. L'Erma di Bretschneider. ISBN 978-88-7062-669-8.
10. Von Cles-Reden, Sibylle (1962). Les Étrusques. Translated by Bittebierren, Monique; Daussy, Henri. Arthaud.
