= Vescovado =

Vescovado may refer to:

- Vescovado, Murlo, a village in Tuscany, Italy
- an Italian Bishop's palace
- an Italian Bishopric

== See also ==
- Vescovato (disambiguation)
