= Bagnaia, Murlo =

Bagnaia
- Frazione
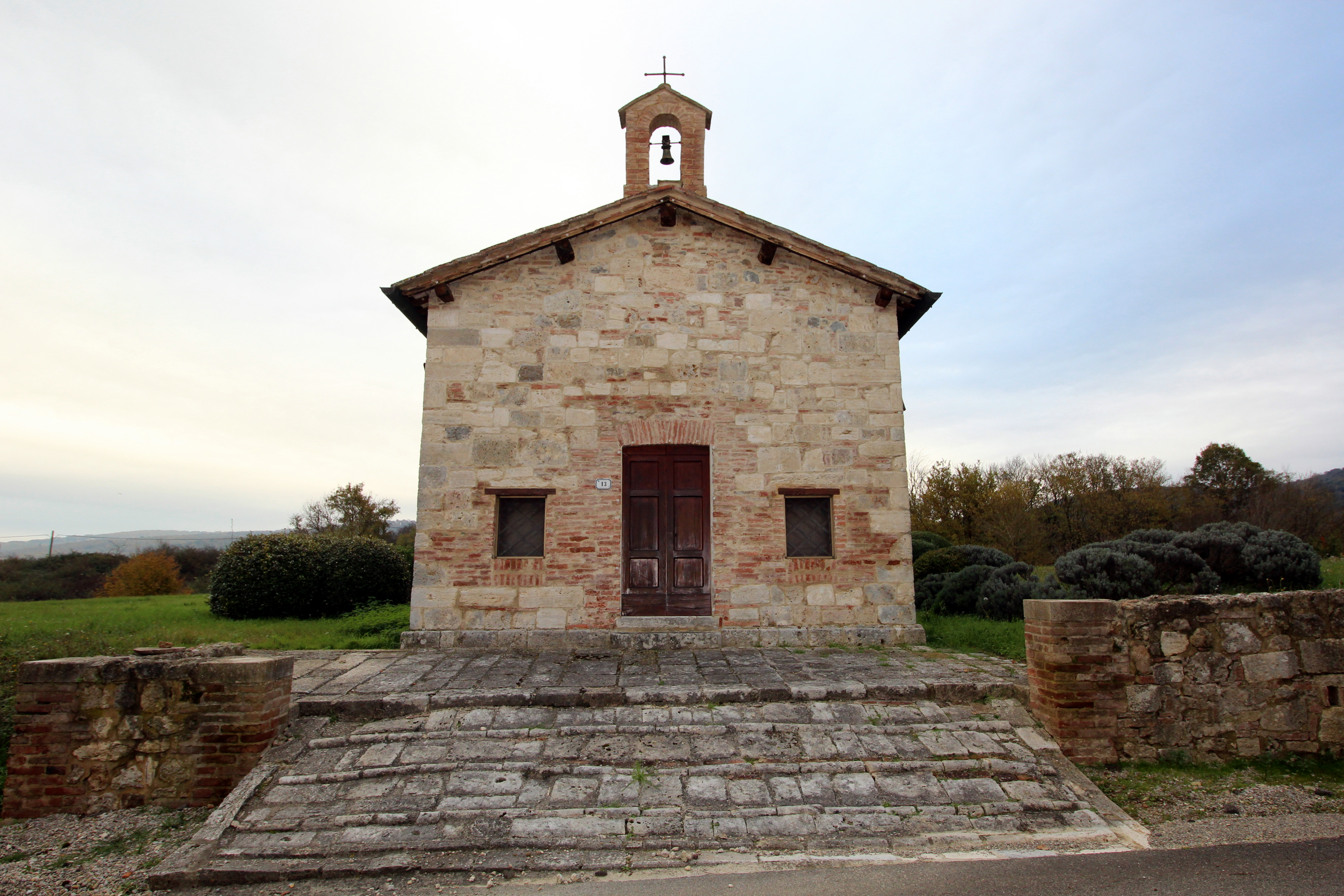

- Location of Bagnaia in Italy
- Coordinates: 43°13′2″N 11°17′35″E
- Country: Italy
- Region: Tuscany
- Province: Siena (SI)
- Comune: Murlo
- Elevation: 246 m (807 ft)

Population (2011)
  - Total: 16
- Time zone: UTC+1 (CET)
  - Summer (DST): UTC+2 (CEST)

Bagnaia is a village in Tuscany, central Italy, administratively a frazione of the comune of Murlo, province of Siena. Its population was 16 at the 2001 census.

Bagnaia is about 18 km from Siena and 16 km from Murlo.
