= Casciano, Murlo =

Casciano
- Frazione
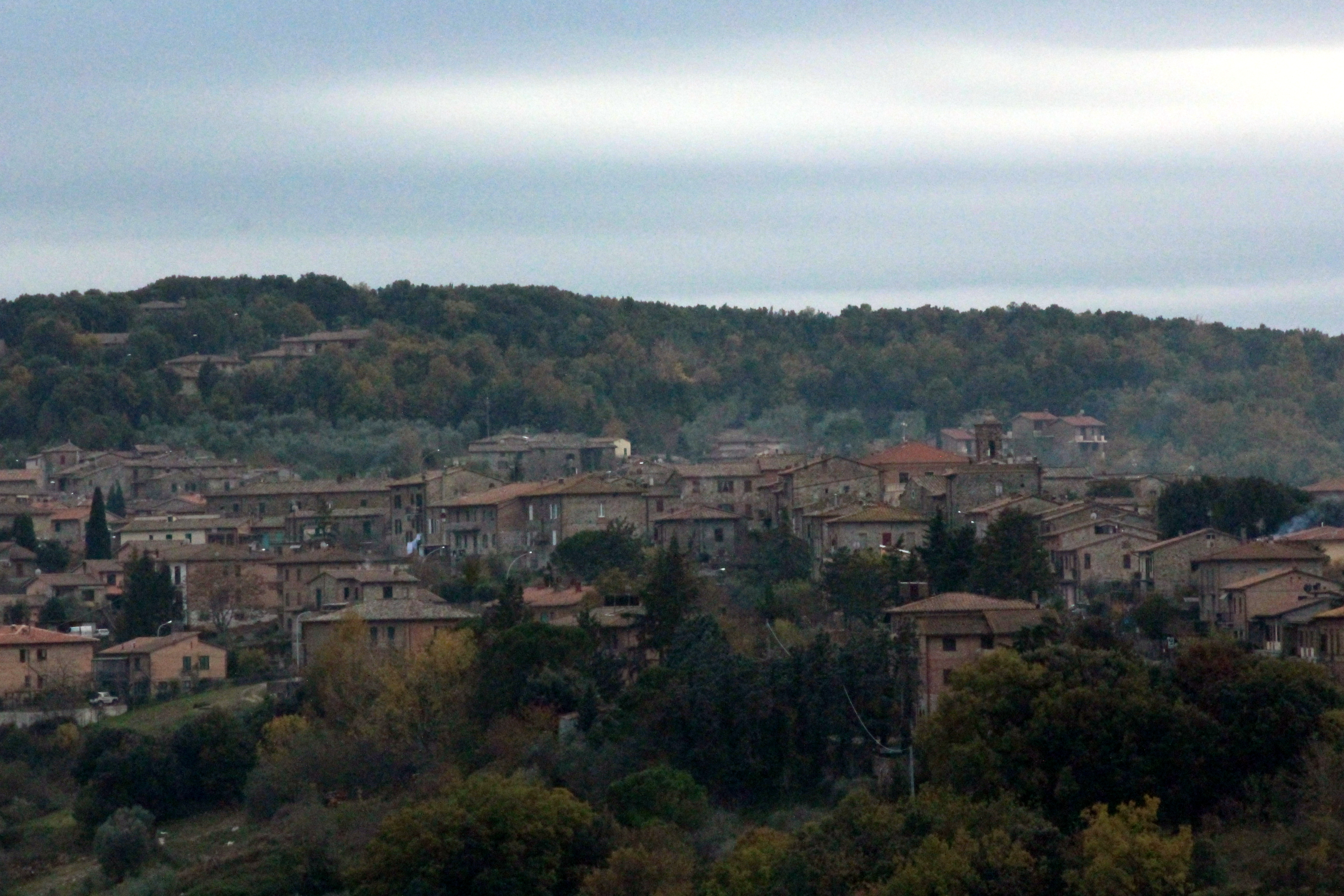
- View of Casciano

- Location of Casciano in Italy
- Coordinates: 43°9′51″N 11°19′31″E
- Country: Italy
- Region: Tuscany
- Province: Siena (SI)
- Comune: Murlo
- Elevation: 452 m (1,483 ft)

Population (2011)
  - Total: 922
- Demonym: Cascianini
- Time zone: UTC+1 (CET)
  - Summer (DST): UTC+2 (CEST)

Casciano is a village in Tuscany, central Italy, administratively a frazione of the comune of Murlo, province of Siena. At the time of the 2001 census its population was 678.
