= Vescovato =

Vescovato may refer to:

- Vescovato, Haute-Corse, France
- Vescovato, Lombardy, Italy

== See also ==
- Vescovado (disambiguation)
