= Montepescini =

- Frazione
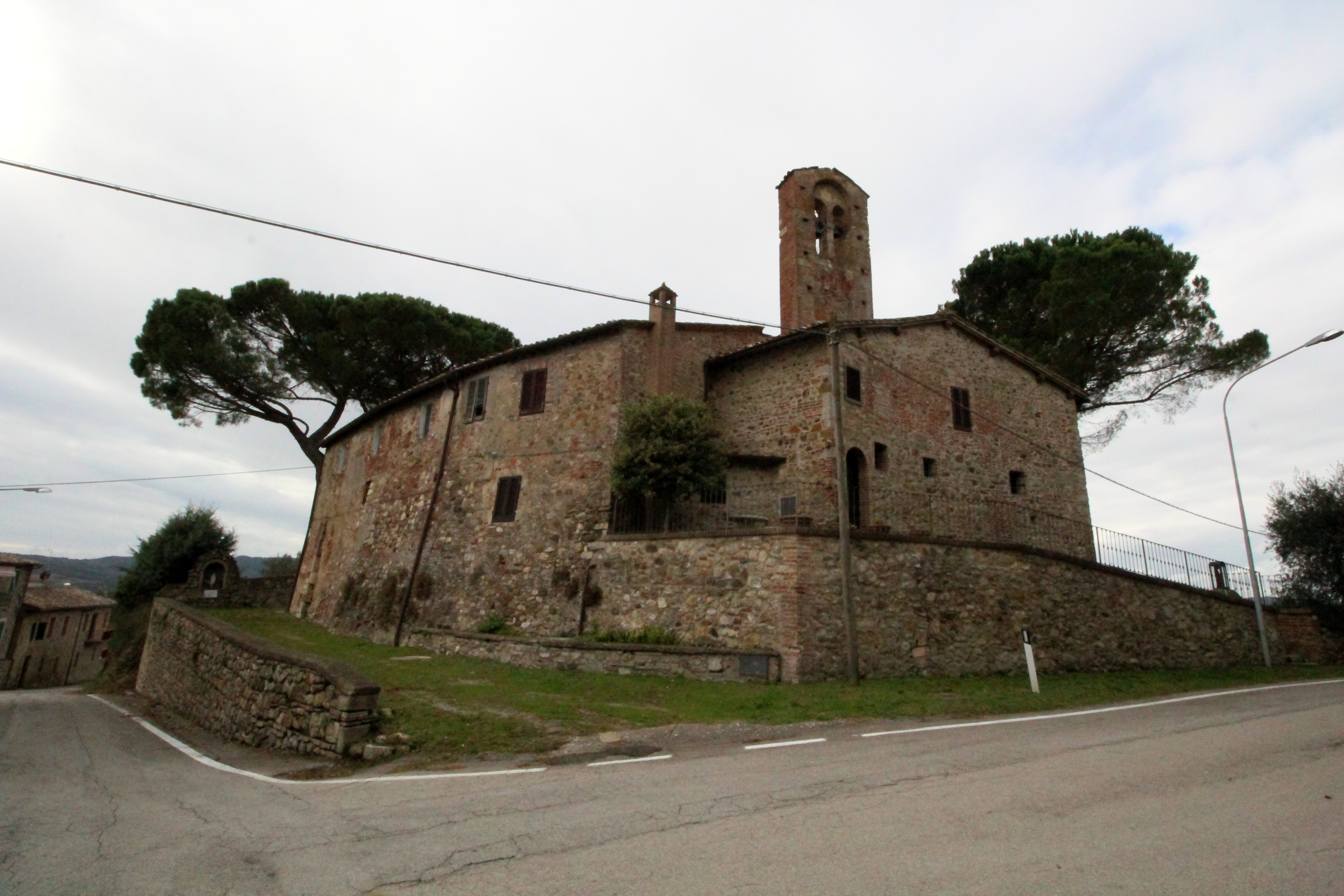
- The church of Santi Pietro e Paolo

- Location of Montepescini in Italy
- Coordinates: 43°6′39″N 11°20′6″E
- Country: Italy
- Region: Tuscany
- Province: Siena (SI)
- Comune: Murlo
- Elevation: 256 m (840 ft)

Population (2011)
  - Total: 16
- Time zone: UTC+1 (CET)
  - Summer (DST): UTC+2 (CEST)

Montepescini is a village in Tuscany, central Italy, administratively a frazione of the comune of Murlo, province of Siena. At the time of the 2001 census its population was 29.
