= La Befa =

- Frazione
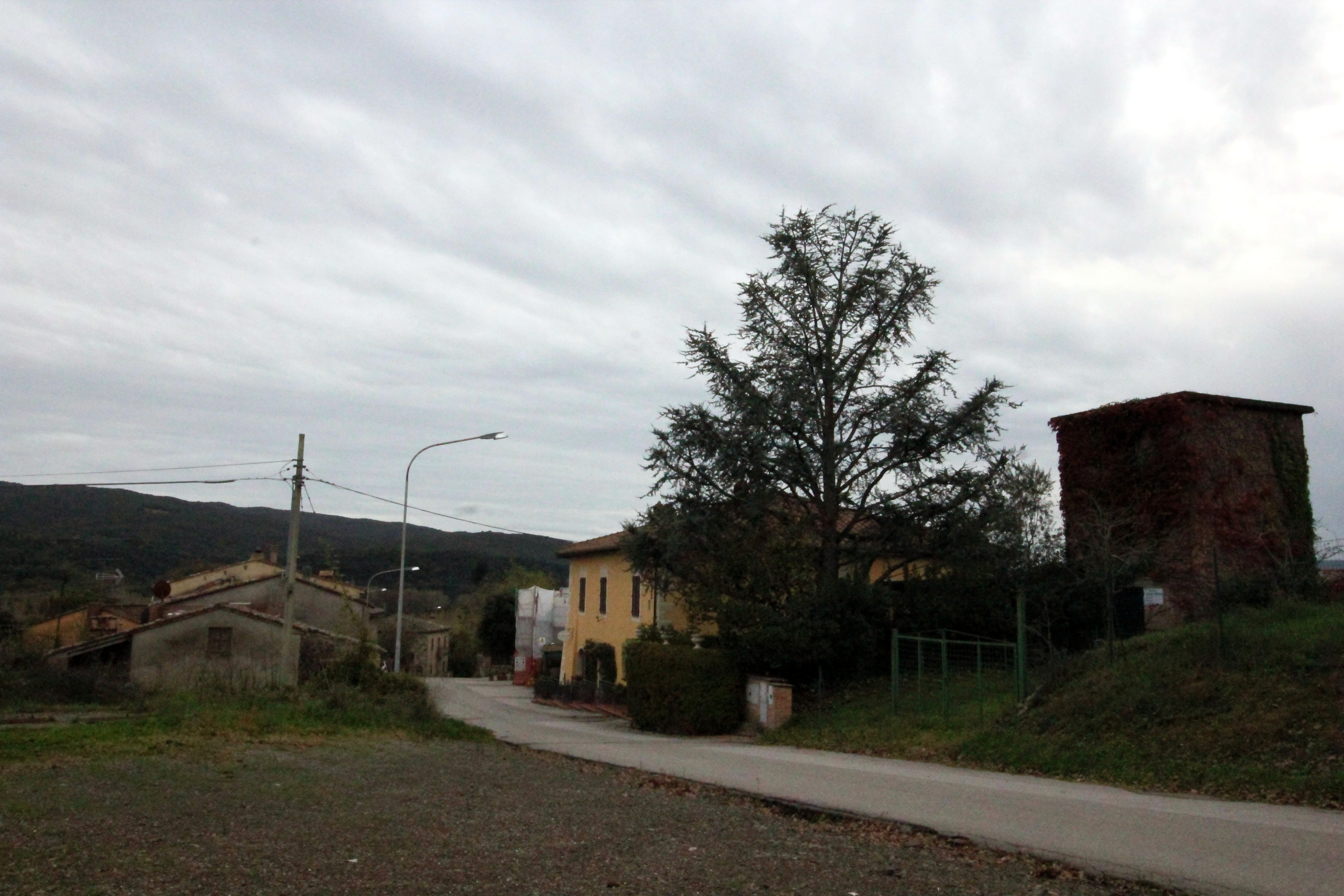

- Location of La Befa in Italy
- Coordinates: 43°7′3″N 11°24′2″E
- Country: Italy
- Region: Tuscany
- Province: Siena (SI)
- Comune: Murlo
- Elevation: 151 m (495 ft)

Population (2011)
  - Total: 34
- Time zone: UTC+1 (CET)
  - Summer (DST): UTC+2 (CEST)

La Befa is a hamlet in Tuscany, central Italy, administratively a frazione of the comune of Murlo, province of Siena. At the time of the 2001 census its population was 26.

== History ==
The area of La Befa has been inhabited since ancient times, with archaeological finds including two Etruscan chamber tombs from the 6th century BC. Notably, a large Roman villa with thermal facilities, active in the 1st-2nd and 4th-5th centuries, was excavated from 1976 to 1977.

La Befa village dates to the early medieval period, documented in a 1084 record as belonging to the nuns of Sant'Ambrogio in Montecellese. Later, it became part of the lands under the Vallombrosan order of Badia Ardenga. Upon the monastery's suppression by Pope Pius II in 1462, it passed into ownership of the archiepiscopal table of Siena.
