= Vescovado, Murlo =

Vescovado
- Frazione
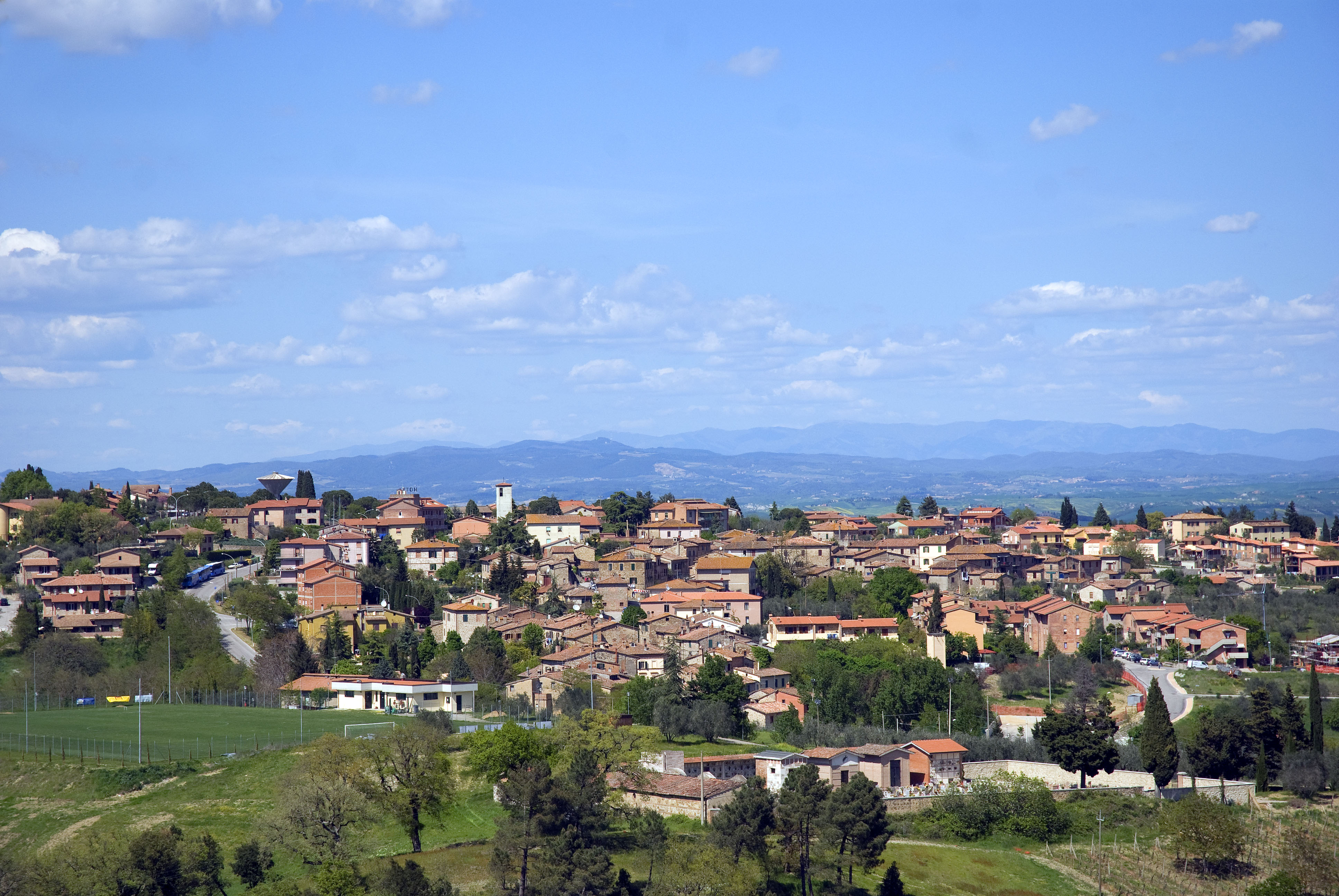
- View of Vescovado

- Location of Vescovado in Italy
- Coordinates: 43°10′10″N 11°23′31″E
- Country: Italy
- Region: Tuscany
- Province: Siena (SI)
- Comune: Murlo
- Elevation: 294 m (965 ft)

Population (2011)
  - Total: 821
- Time zone: UTC+1 (CET)
  - Summer (DST): UTC+2 (CEST)

Vescovado is a village in Tuscany, central Italy, administratively a frazione of the comune of Murlo, province of Siena. At the time of the 2001 census its population was 679.
