= Murlo =

- Comune
- Comune di Murlo
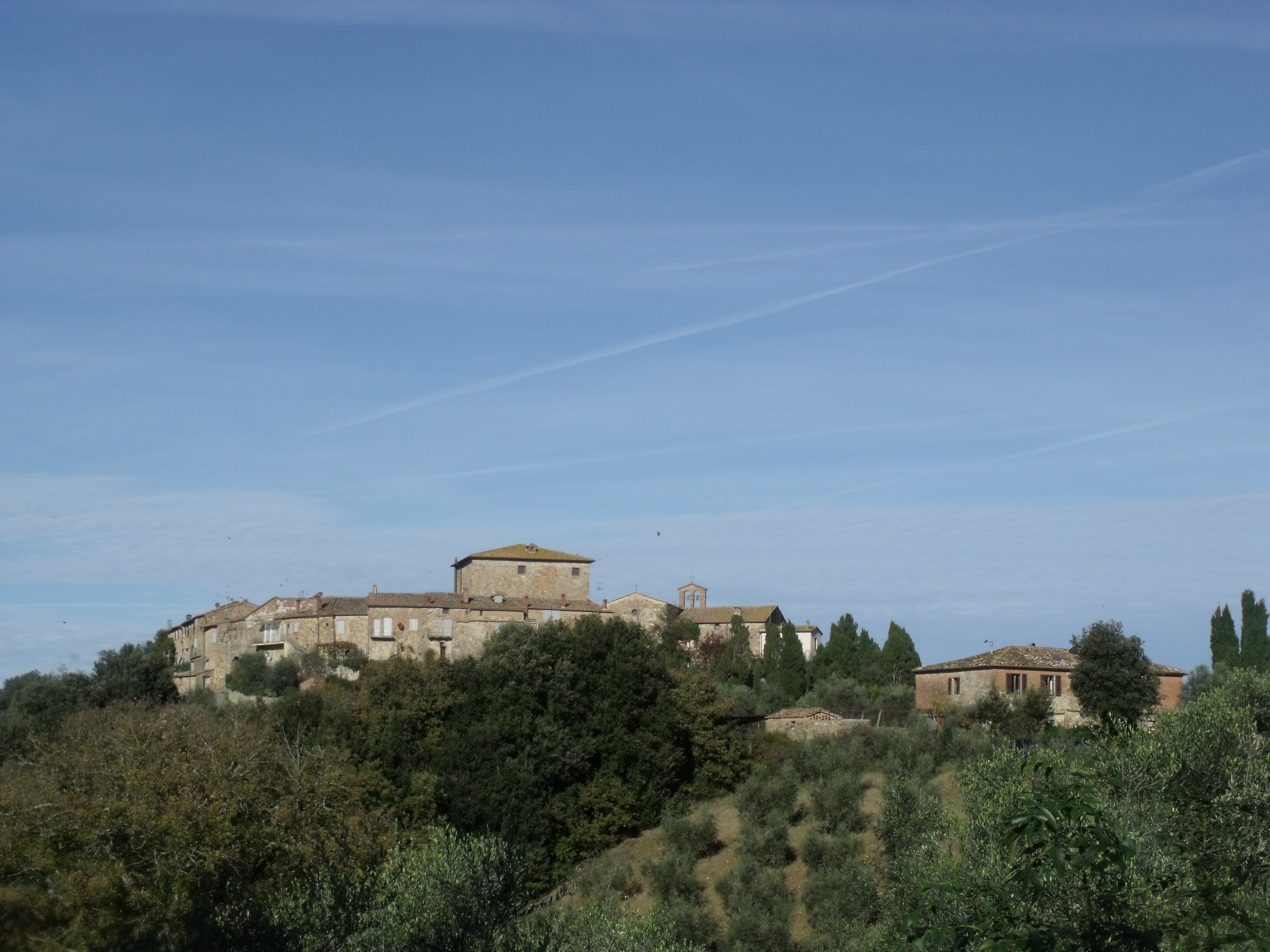
- View of the castle of Murlo

- Coat of arms

- Location within Italy Location within Tuscany
- Coordinates: 43°10′N 11°23′E
- Country: Italy
- Region: Tuscany
- Province: Siena (SI)
- Frazioni: Bagnaia, Casciano, La Befa, Montepescini, Vescovado

Government
  - Mayor: Fabiola Parenti

Area
  - Total: 115.0 km^{2} (44.4 sq mi)
- Elevation: 294 m (965 ft)

Population (30 November 2017)
  - Total: 2,453
  - Density: 21.33/km^{2} (55.25/sq mi)
- Time zone: UTC+1 (CET)
  - Summer (DST): UTC+2 (CEST)
- Postal code: 53016
- Dialing code: 0577
- Patron saint: St. Fortunatus
- Saint day: 12 July
- Website: Official website

Murlo is a comune (municipality) in the Province of Siena in the Italian region Tuscany, located about 70 kilometres (43 mi) south of Florence and about 20 kilometres (12 mi) south of Siena.

Murlo borders the following municipalities: Buonconvento, Civitella Paganico, Montalcino, Monteroni d'Arbia, Monticiano, Sovicille.

== History ==
From 1189 to 1778 it was the seat of the homonym "Feudo vescovile di Murlo", ecclesiastical signoria governed by the bishop of Siena, of which remains the palace and the adjacent church of San Fortunato, where the Bishop celebrated religious rites.

The hill of Poggio Civitate was an ancient settlement located in the commune and currently the site of archaeological investigations.

Most of the municipal population resides in Vescovado and Casciano. Vescovado is also home to the municipal house.

== Geography ==
The territory, exclusively hilly, is between the valley of the river Merse and the Val d'Arbia. The landscape has high hills and woods on the side of the river Merse going towards the Maremma, but on the side of the river Arbia the hills are low and softer typical of the Crete Senesi.

The municipality of Murlo can be considered in some respects a scattered municipality, as the village that gives its name to the municipality is not the town hall that is located, instead, in Vescovado. The village of Murlo (317 m a.s.l., 23 inhabitants) is mostly a tourist center for the presence of the medieval walls, the museum and the cathedral, all municipal activities take place in the villages of Vescovado, where the town hall is located, and Casciano, the two most populous villages.

=== Hamlets ===
- Bagnaia (246 m a.s.l., 16 ab.)
- Casciano (452 m a.s.l., 922 ab.)
- La Befa (151 m a.s.l., 34 ab.)
- Montepescini (256 m s.l.m., 16 ab.)
- Vescovado (294 m a.s.l., 821 ab.)

=== Other locations in the territory ===
Other minor localities of the territory are Aiello, Belcano, Campeccioli, Campolungo, Campriano, Casanova, Crevole, Cucculeggia, Filetta, Fontazzi, Formignano, Frontignano, Gonfienti, Lupompesi, Macereto, Miniere di Murlo, Mocale, Montepertuso, Montorgiali, Olivello, Pacanino, Palazzaccio, Piantasala, Pieve a Carli, Poggiobrucoli, Poggiolodoli, Pompana, Resi, San Giusto, Santo Stefano, Tinoni, Vallerano.

== Twin towns ==
- Giberville, France
