= Phoenician metal bowls =

7th–8th century BCE artifacts

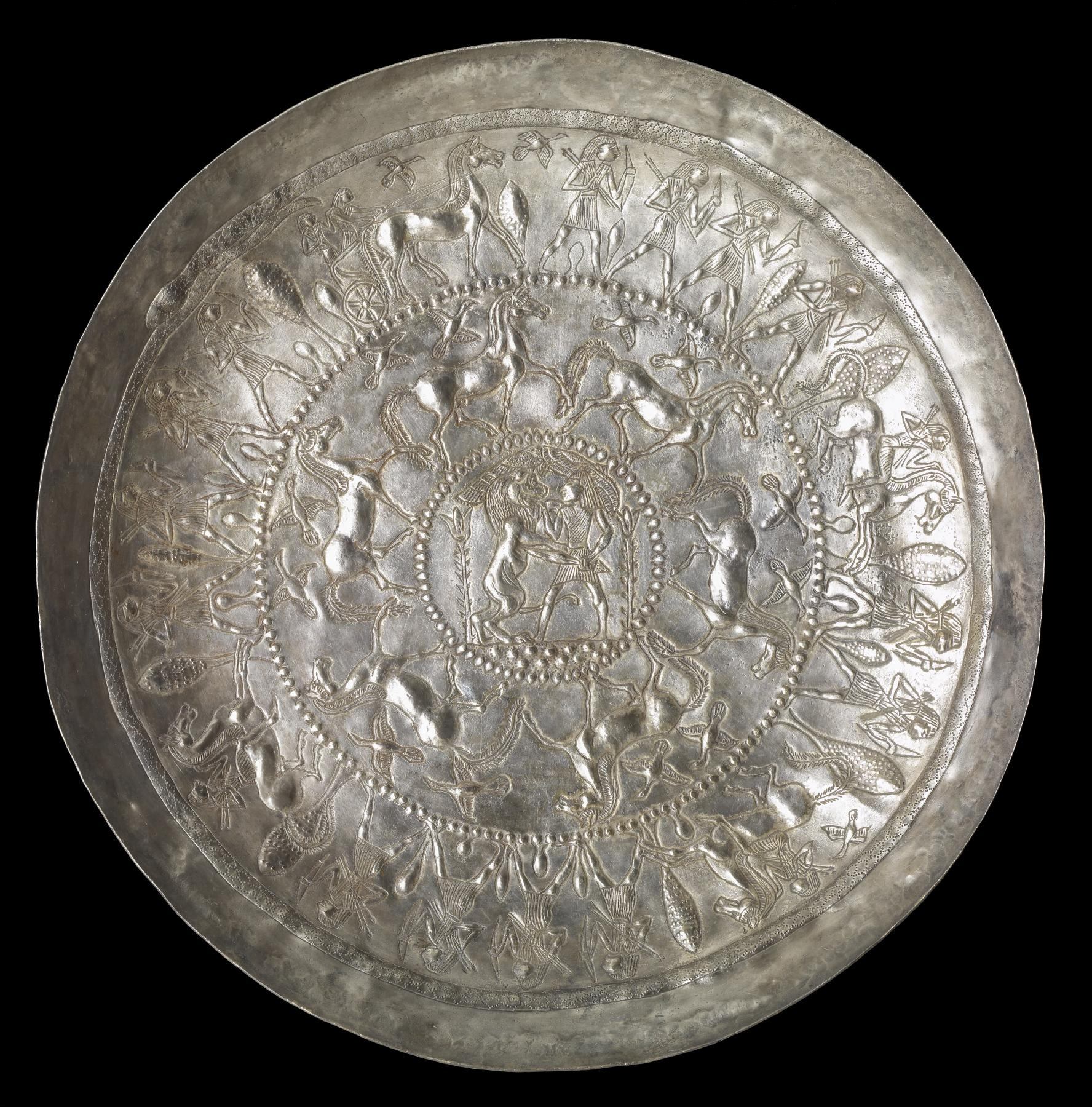
A Phoenician silver-gilt bowl from the Walters Art Museum showing a hunting scene, originally discovered in Etruria

Phoenician metal bowls are approximately 90 decorated bowls made in the 7th–8th centuries BCE in bronze, silver and gold (often in the form of electrum), found since the mid-19th century in the Eastern Mediterranean and Iraq. They were historically attributed to the Phoenicians, but are today considered to have been made by a broader group of Levantine peoples.

The first bowls published widely had been discovered by Austen Henry Layard in 1849 in the palace of Ashurnasirpal II at Nimrud. The discovery of these bowls began not just the known corpus of Phoenician metal bowls, but according to Nicholas Vella: "effectively gave birth to Phoenician art as a style, a definition with which historians of art still largely concur." They are foundational artefacts in the study of Phoenician art, together with the Nimrud ivories, which were discovered at the same time but identified as Phoenician a few years later. However, both the bowls and the ivories pose a significant challenge as no examples of either – or any other artefacts with equivalent features – have been found in Phoenicia or other major colonies (e.g. Carthage, Malta, Sicily). The whole corpus was studied in detail by Glenn Markoe in 1985.

The bowls contain hunting, battle, and animal scenes with clear influence from Assyrian and Egyptian art. They are thought to have been made using repoussé and chasing, as well as embossing, metalworking techniques.

== Discovery and identification ==
=== Nimrud bowls ===
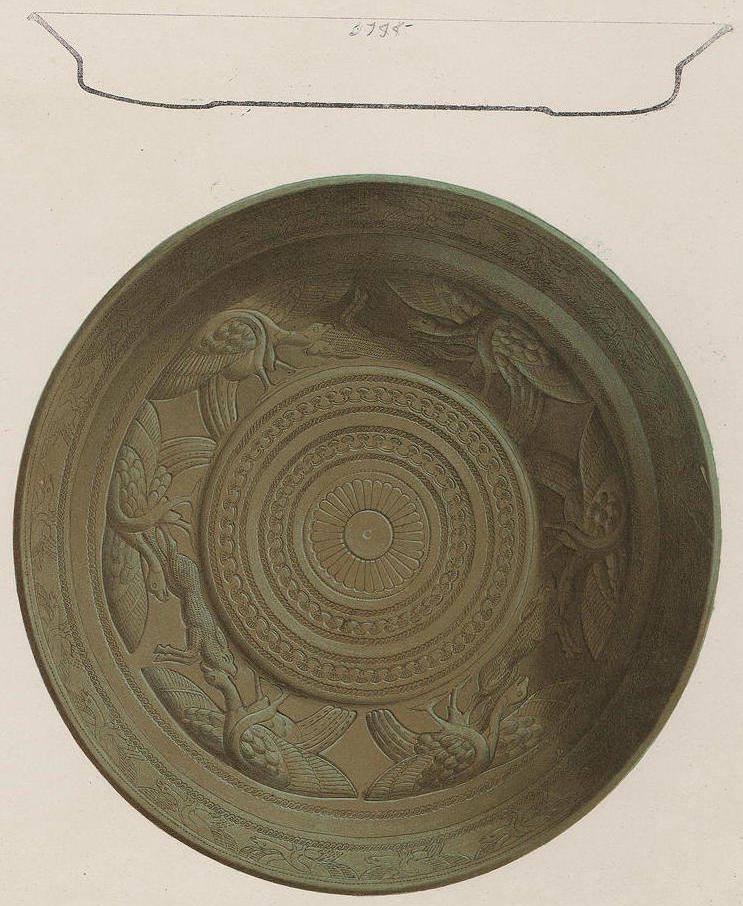
The first publication of Phoenician metal bowls, by Austen Henry Layard in 1853. This is one of 16 metal bowls from Nimrud with a Phoenician inscription (see letters on top sketch of the side profile). Currently in the British Museum as item N.19; its inscription was later published as CIS II 1.49.

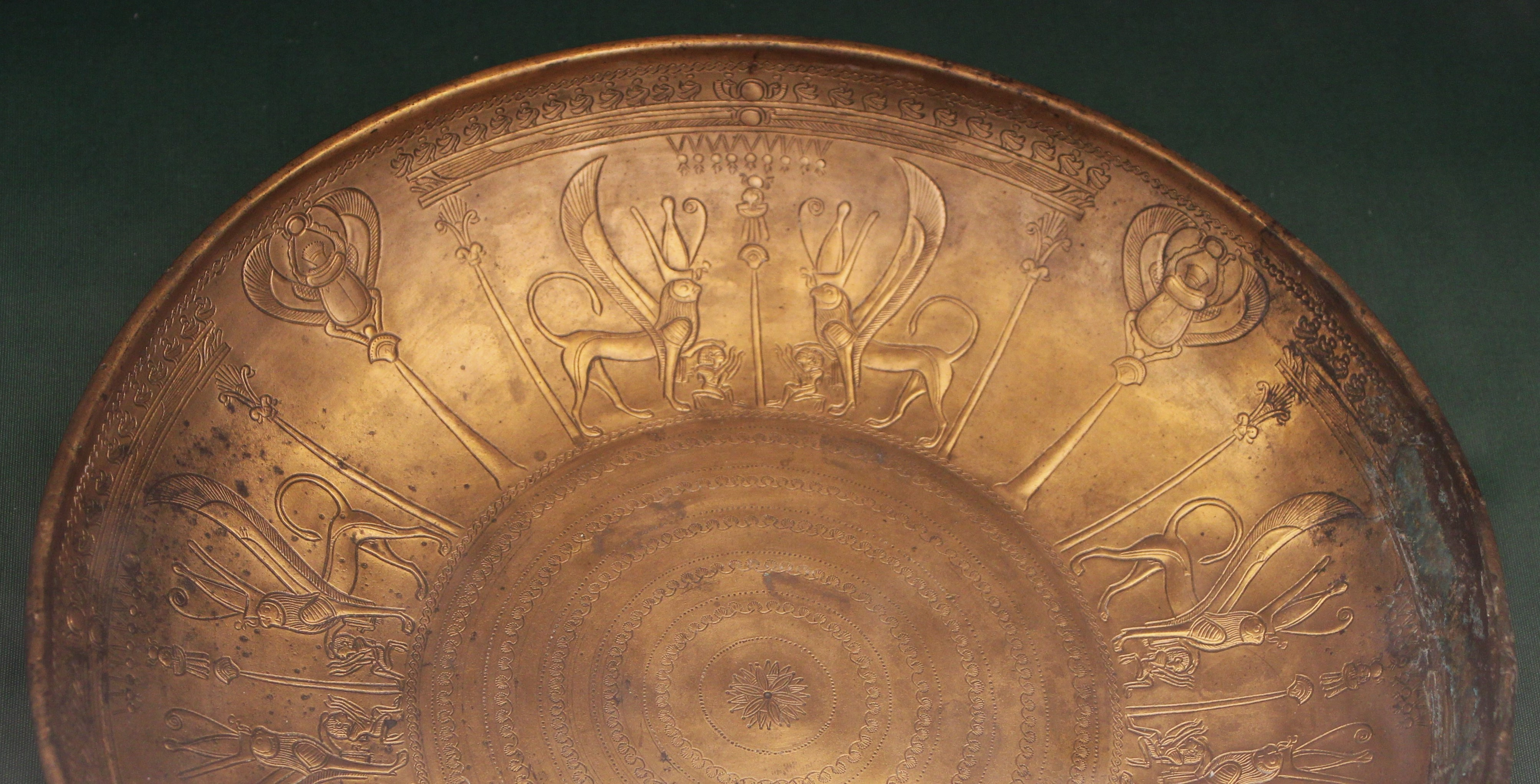
Detail of one of the Nimrud bowls with Egyptianizing motifs on display in the British Museum, c. 9th–8th century BCE

The first bowls of this type published widely were discovered in Nimrud in 1849 by Austen Henry Layard, a number of which contained short inscriptions in the Phoenician alphabet. Layard described them as follows, identifying them as Phoenician with reference to the Biblical stories of Hiram I, who was described as a skilled bronzeworker, and the Sidonian silver mixing bowl described in book 23 of Homer's Iliad:

The embossed and engraved vessels from Nimroud afford many interesting illustrations of the progress made by the ancients in metallurgy. From the Egyptian character of the designs, and especially of the drapery of the figures, in several of the specimens, it may be inferred that some of them were not Assyrian, but had been brought from a foreign people. As in the ivories, however, the workmanship, subjects, and mode of treatment are more Assyrian than Egyptian, and seem to show that the artist either copied from Egyptian models, or was a native of a country under the influence of the arts and taste of Egypt.

The Sidonians, and other inhabitants of the Phœnician coast, were the most renowned workers in metal of the ancient world, and their intermediate position between the two great nations, by which they were alternately invaded and subdued, may have been the cause of the existence of a mixed art amongst them. In the Homeric poems they are frequently mentioned as the artificers who fashioned and embossed metal cups and bowls, and Solomon sought cunning men from Tyre to make the gold and brazen utensils for his temple and palaces. (Note: Layard's footnote: "1 Kings, vii. 13, 14. 2 Chron. iv. The importance attached to such objects in metal, which were chiefly used for sacred purposes, is shown by its being especially recorded that Huram (or Hiram), the widow's son, was sent for to make "the pots, and the shovels, and the basons." Homer particularly mentions Sidonian goblets as used at the funeral games of Patroclus.") It is, therefore, not impossible that the vessels discovered at Nimroud were the work of Phœnician artists, (Note: Layard's footnote: "It will be remembered that Phœnician characters occur on one of the plates. The discovery in Cyprus of twelve silver bowls very closely resembling those found at Nimroud, tend further to confirm the idea that many of these relics were the works of Phœnician artists; unfortunately only two of these curious vessels have been preserved; they are now in Paris; one, the most perfect, in the collection of the Duc de Luines, the other placed by M. de Saulcy in the Louvre.") brought expressly from Tyre, or carried away amongst the captives when their cities were taken by the Assyrians, who, we know from many passages in the Bible, always secured the smiths and artizans, and placed them in their own immediate dominions.

They may have been used for sacrificial purposes, at royal banquets, or when the king performed certain religious ceremonies, for in the bas-reliefs he is frequently represented on such occasions with a cup or bowl in his hand; or they may have formed part of the spoil of some Syrian nation, placed in a temple at Nineveh, as the holy utensils of the Jews, after the destruction of the sanctuary, were kept in the temple of Babylon. It is not, indeed, impossible, that some of them may have been actually brought from the cities round Jerusalem by Sennacherib himself, or from Samaria by Shalmaneser or Sargon, who, we find, inhabited the palace at Nimroud, and of whom several relics have already been discovered in the ruins.

Four of the bowls with inscriptions were published in the second volume of Corpus Inscriptionum Semiticarum: CIS II 1.46 (British Museum ID: N.619), CIS II 1.47 (N.50), CIS II 1.48 (N.14), CIS II 1.49 (N.19).

=== Cyprus bowls ===
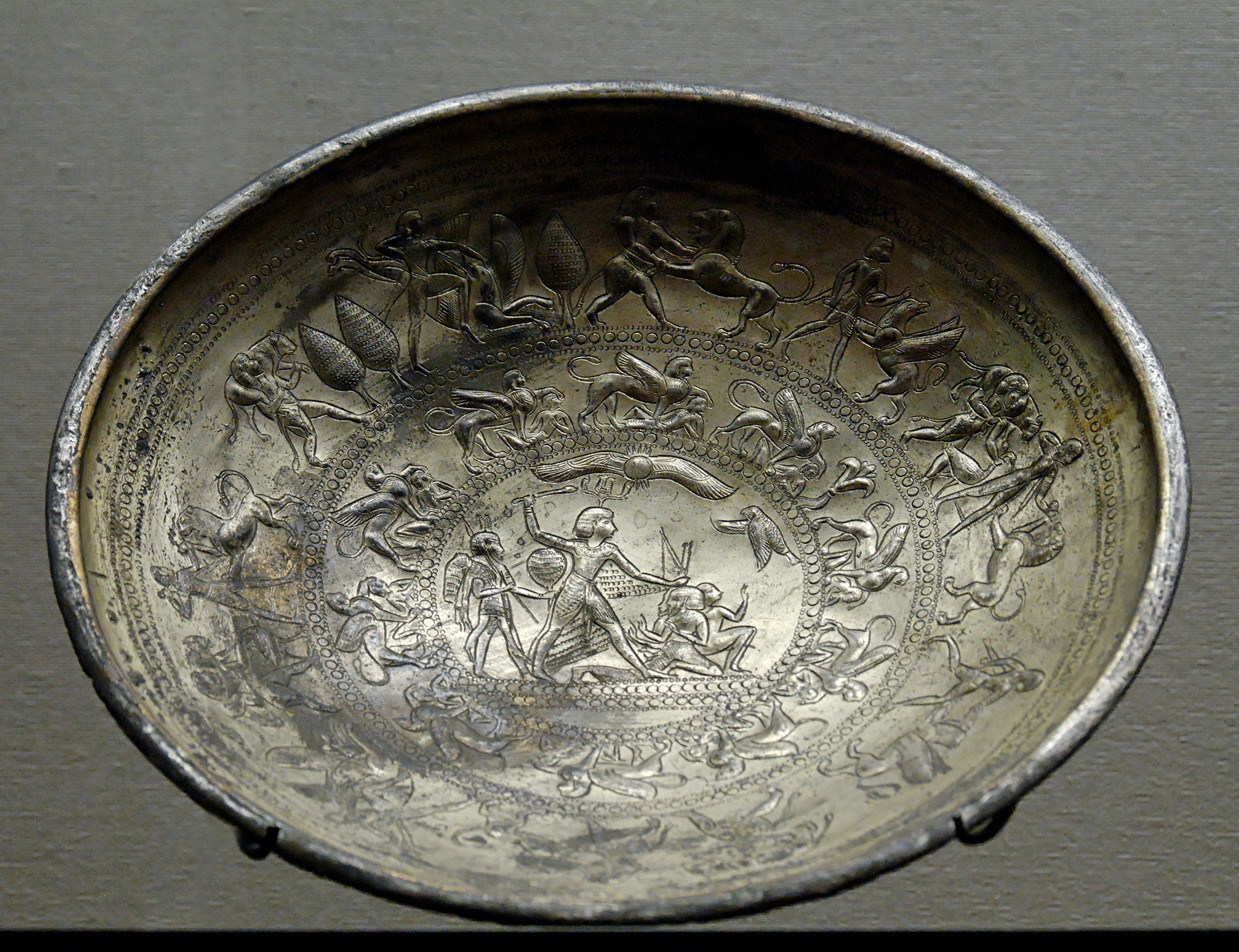
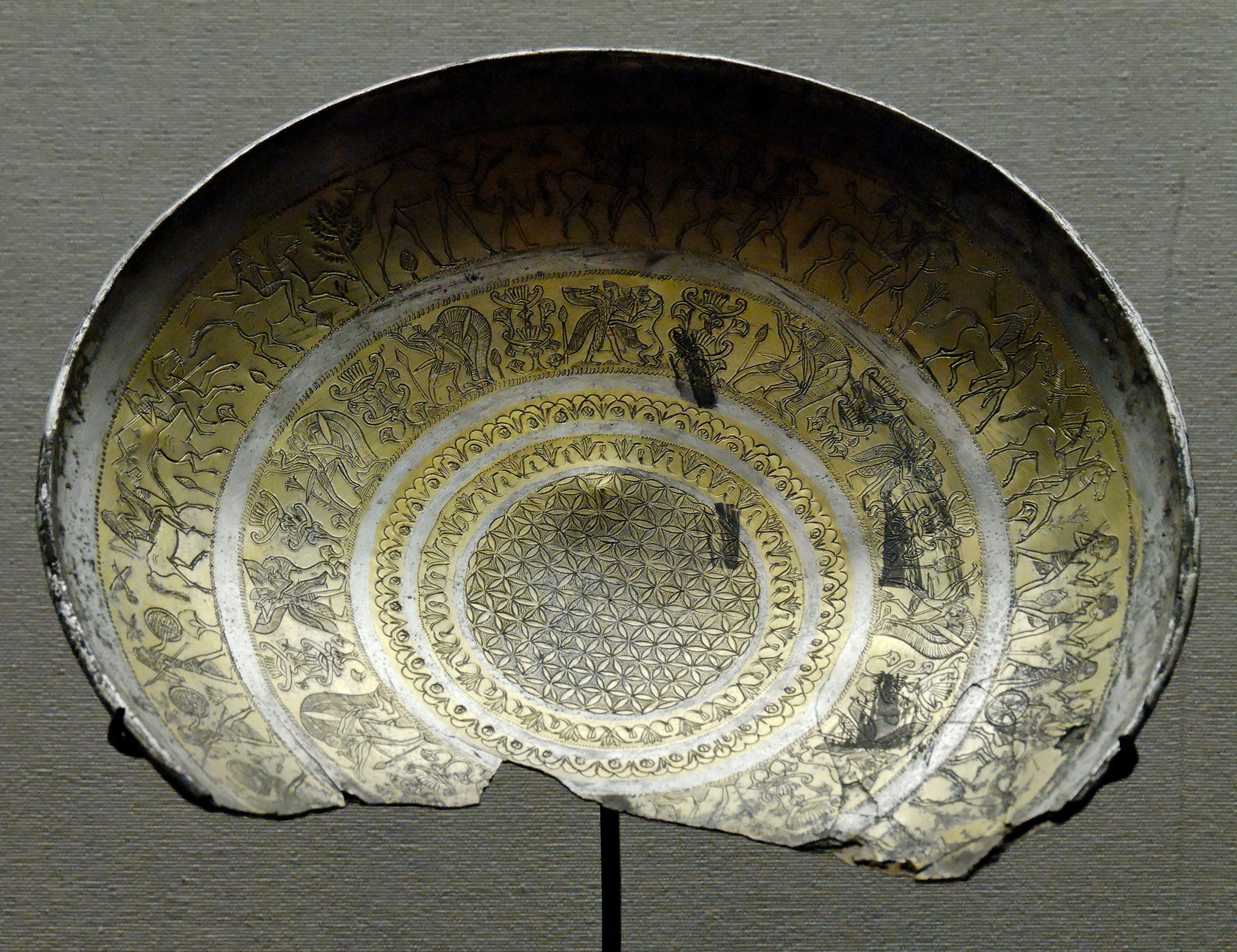
The first two Phoenician bowls found in Cyprus, today at the Louvre

At around the same time, twelve silver bowls of a similar nature were found in Cyprus. Ten of the bowls were lost, and presumed to have been melted down for their metal. The two remaining were acquired by antiquities dealers, and later were – separately – given to the Louvre.

Another Phoenician silver bowl from Cyprus was found in Amathus before 1877 by the archeologist Luigi Palma di Cesnola. Now in the British Museum, it is fragmentary but still displays evocative military scenes from antiquity.

Layard claimed a connection between the Nimrud and Cyprus bowls in his books.

=== Etruscan tombs ===
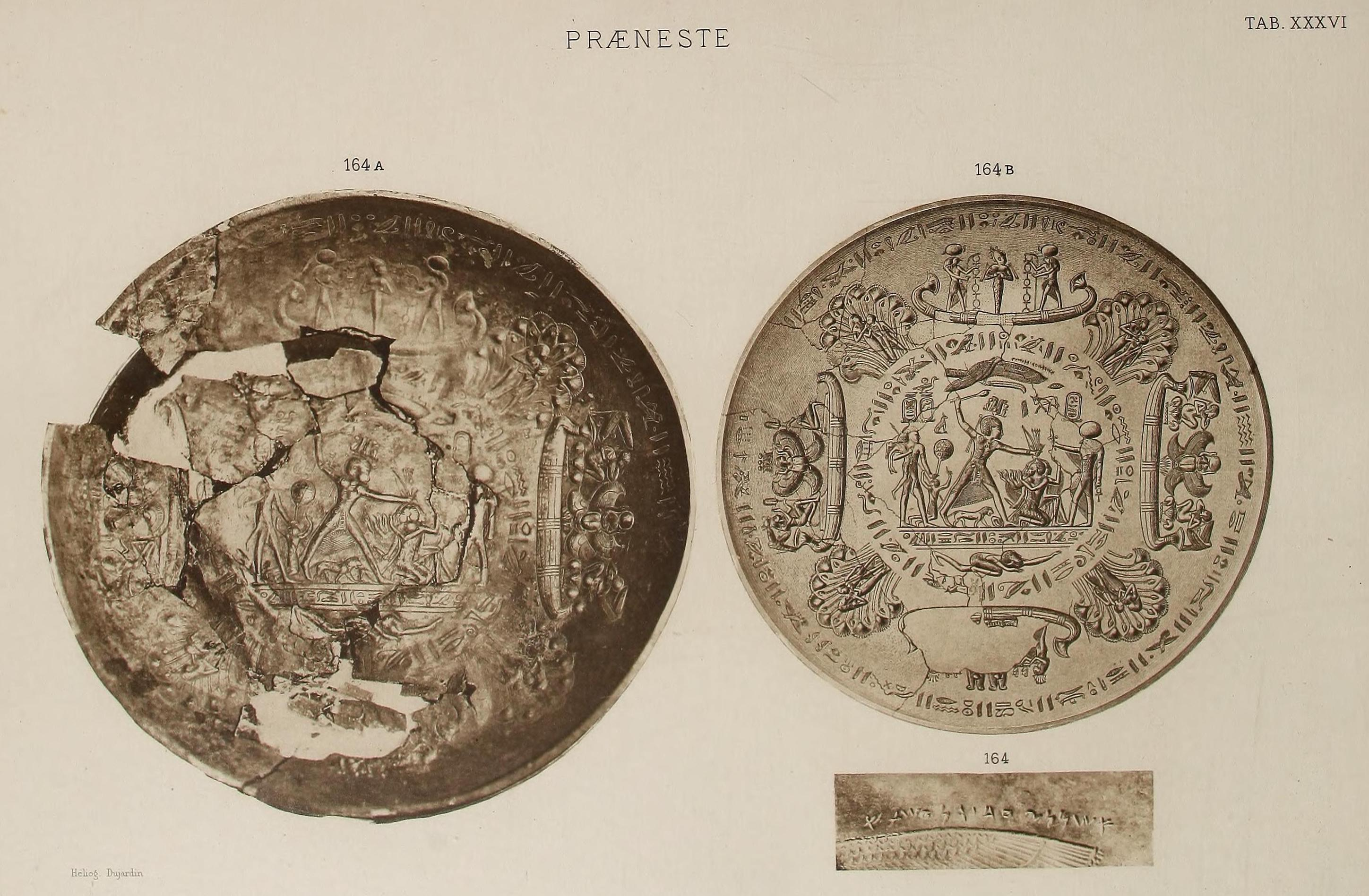
Published in the first volume of Corpus Inscriptionum Semiticarum as inscription CIS I 164. The original is in the National Etruscan Museum

The first Phoenician bowls uncovered in modern times were found in 1836 at the Regolini-Galassi tomb in the Banditaccia Necropolis of Cerveteri, about 50 km north of Rome, and were published by Luigi Grifi in 1841. However, these were not widely known at the time of Layard's 1849 discoveries in Nimrud, and the specific connection to the Phoenician bowls was only made in 1876 following the discovery of the Bernardini Tomb.

In 1855 and 1876, two ancient tombs were uncovered in Palestrina (ancient Praeneste), around 30 km east of Rome – the Barberini Tomb and the Bernardini Tomb. They contained a number of silver bowls, including one with a detailed Phoenician inscription that was published a few years later as CIS I 164. Following the Bernardini tomb discovery, archaeologist Wolfgang Helbig published a letter he had written to Sardinian antiquarian and politician Giovanni Spano, who had himself published the Pauli Gerrei trilingual inscription about 15 years previously. The letter was entitled Notes on Phoenician Art, and included a detailed survey of all the Phoenician metal bowls that had been found to date.

Today many of the bowls from Etruscan tombs are at the Museo Gregoriano Etrusco in the Vatican.

== Gallery ==
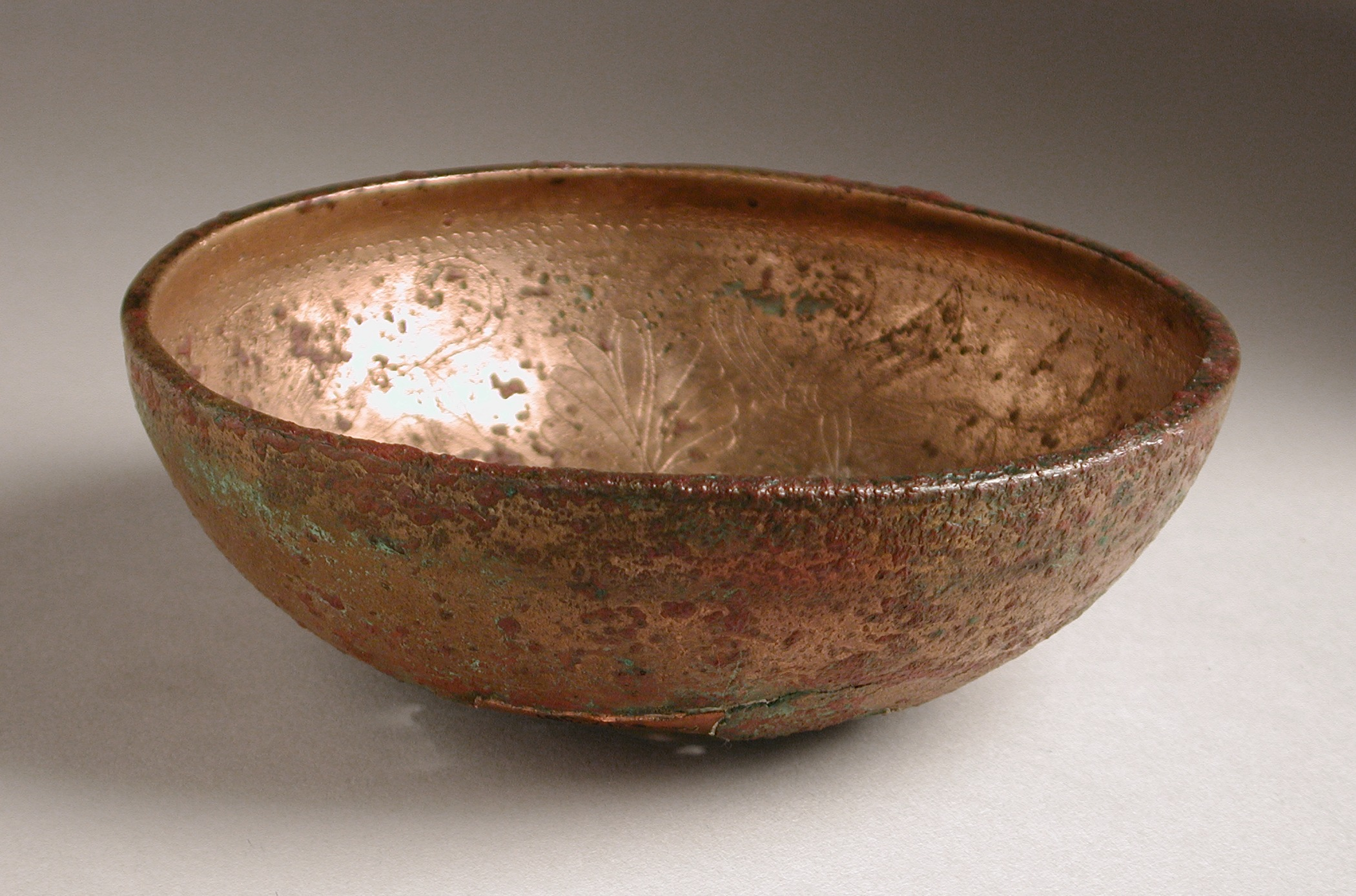
Los Angeles County Museum of Art

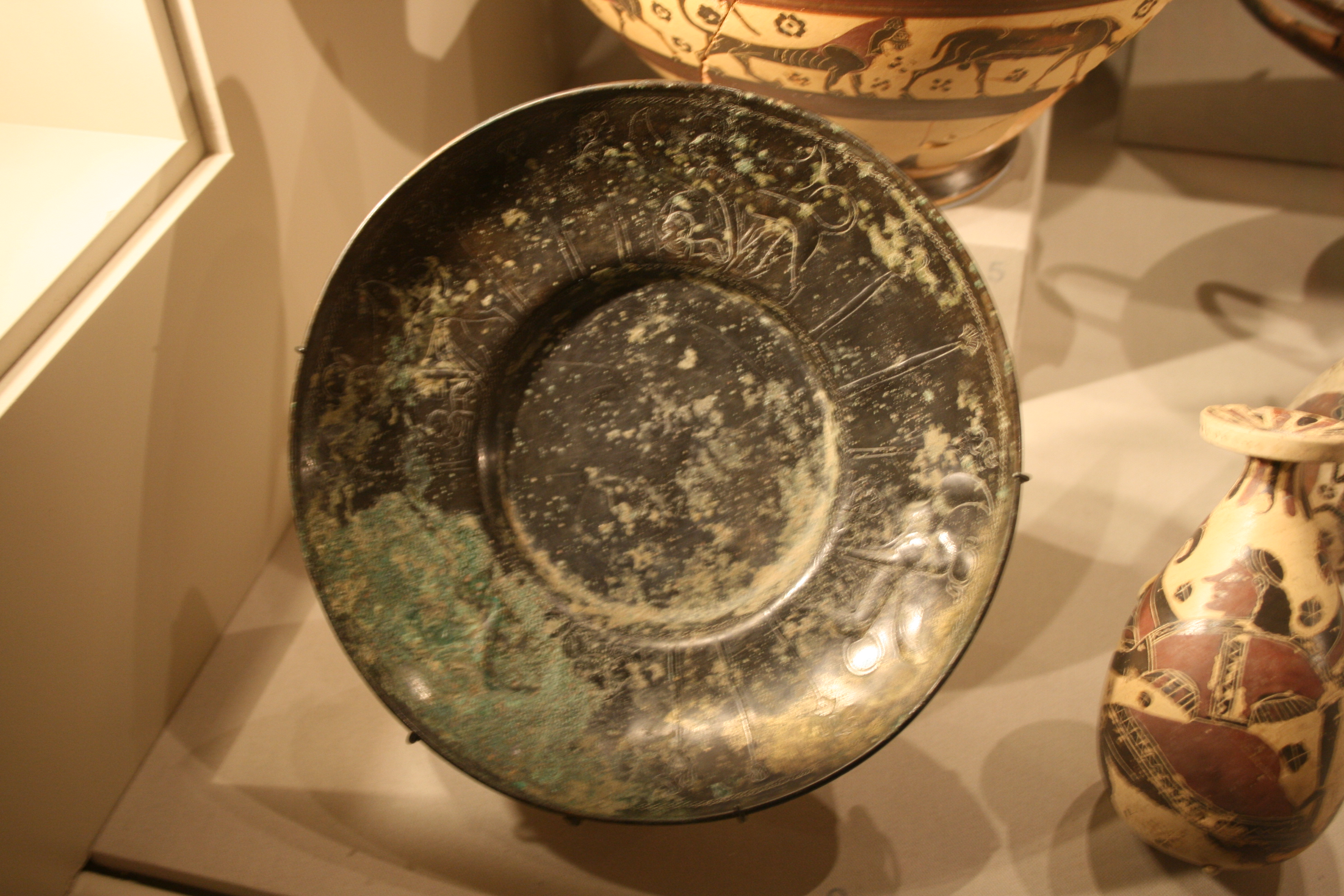
Michael C. Carlos Museum, Atlanta

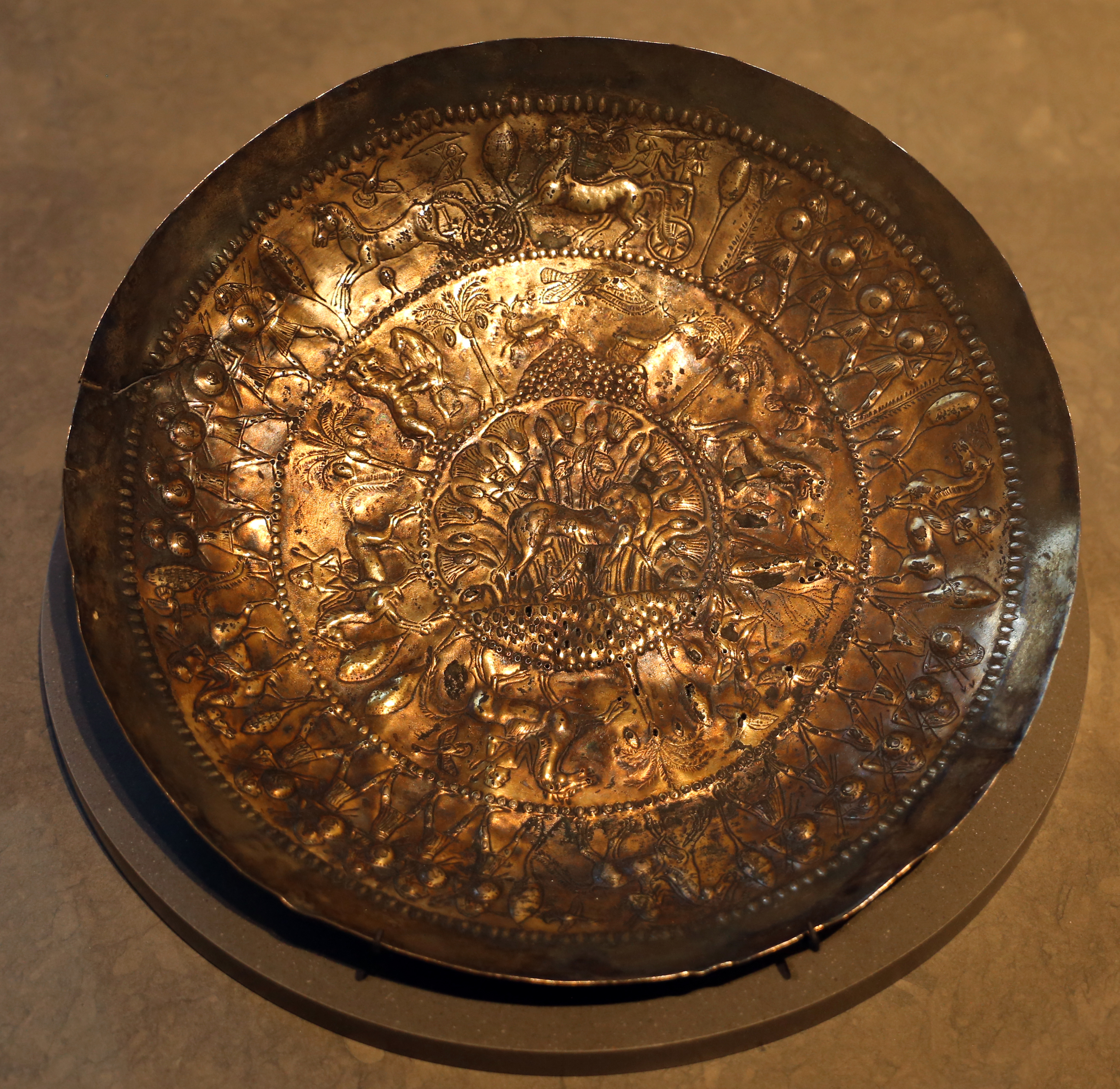
Rijksmuseum van Oudheden (ID: B 1943/9.1)

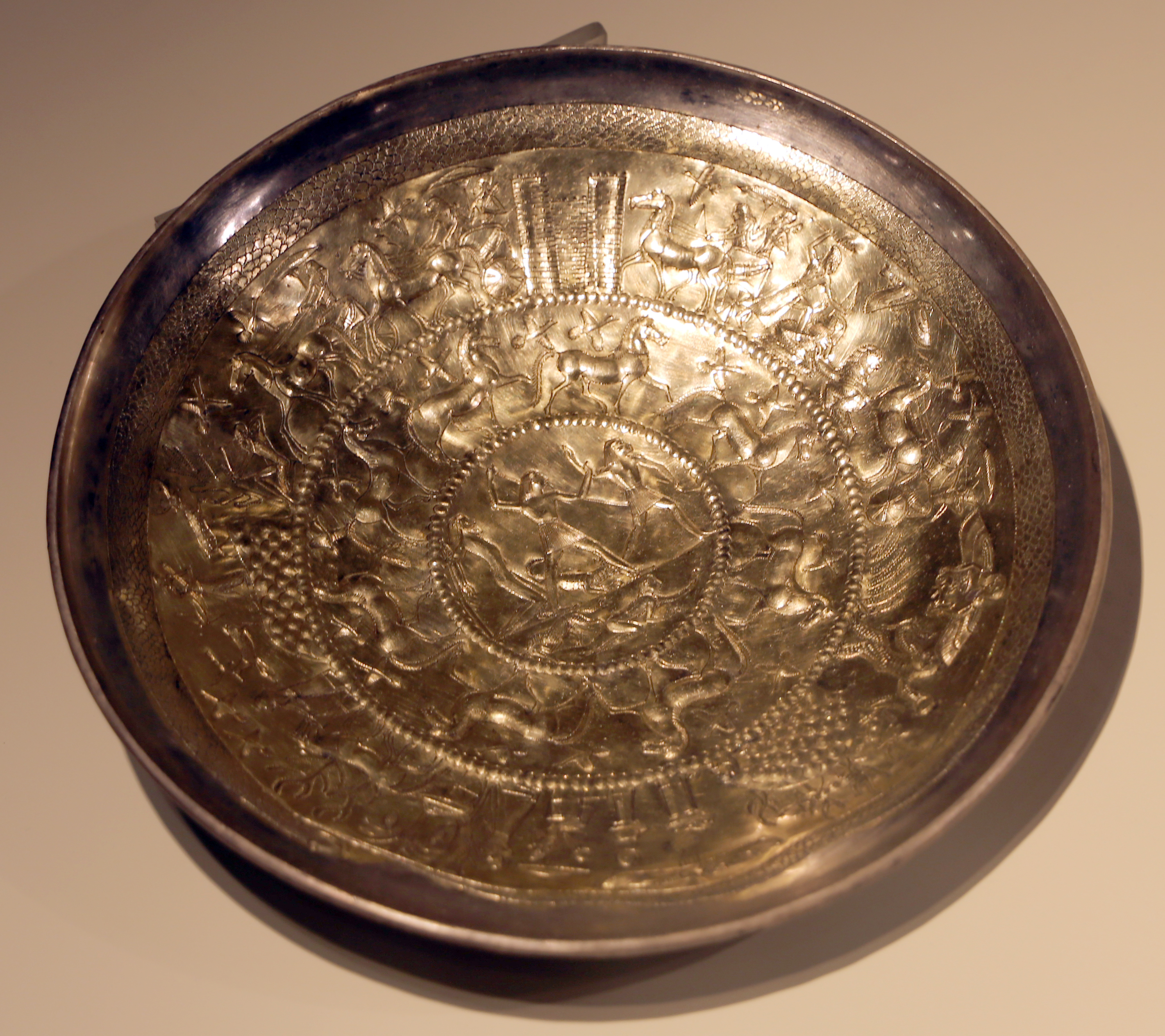
National Etruscan Museum, from the Tomba Bernardini (see original sketch from 1876 here)

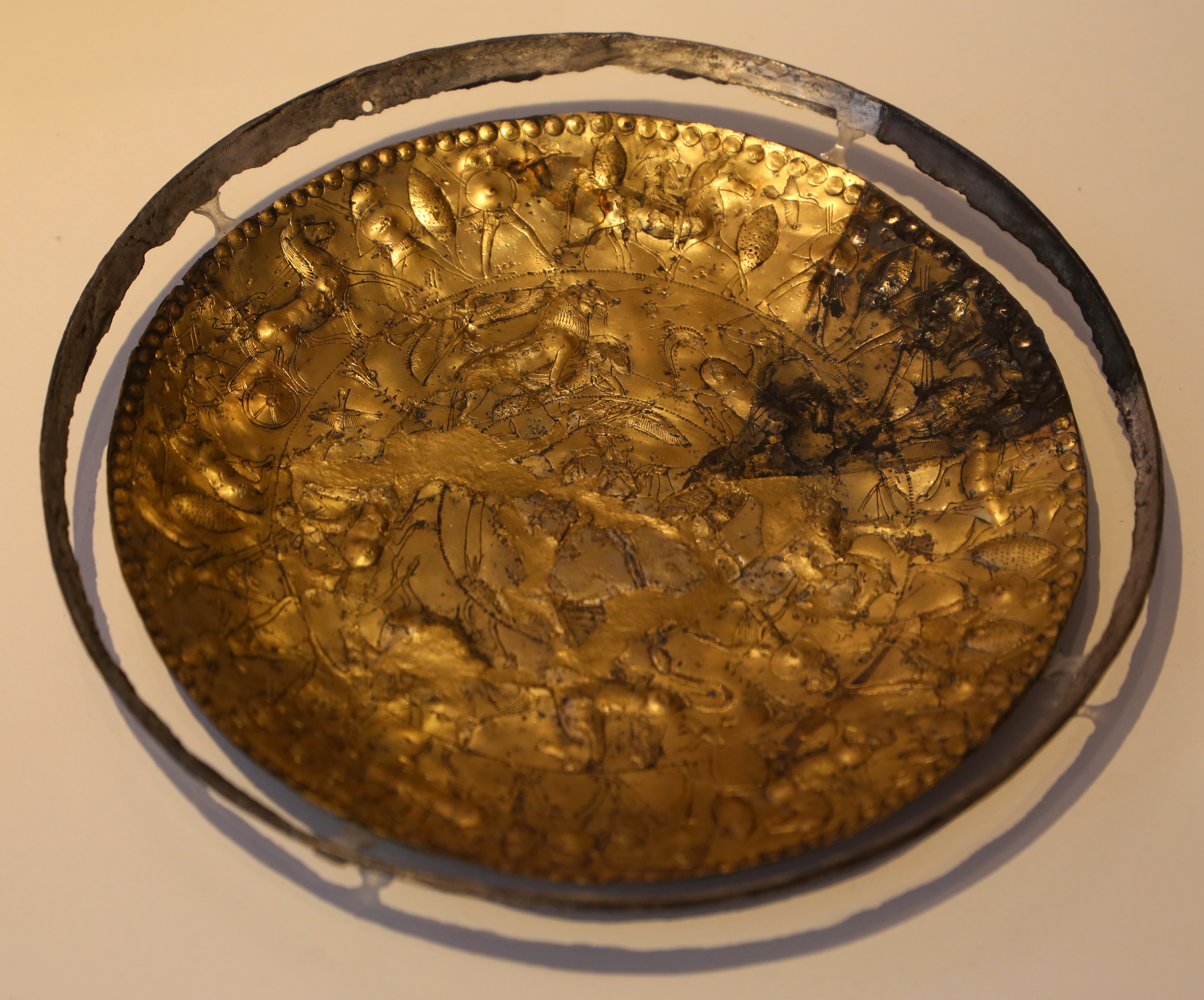
National Etruscan Museum from the Tomba Barberini (see 1925 photo here)

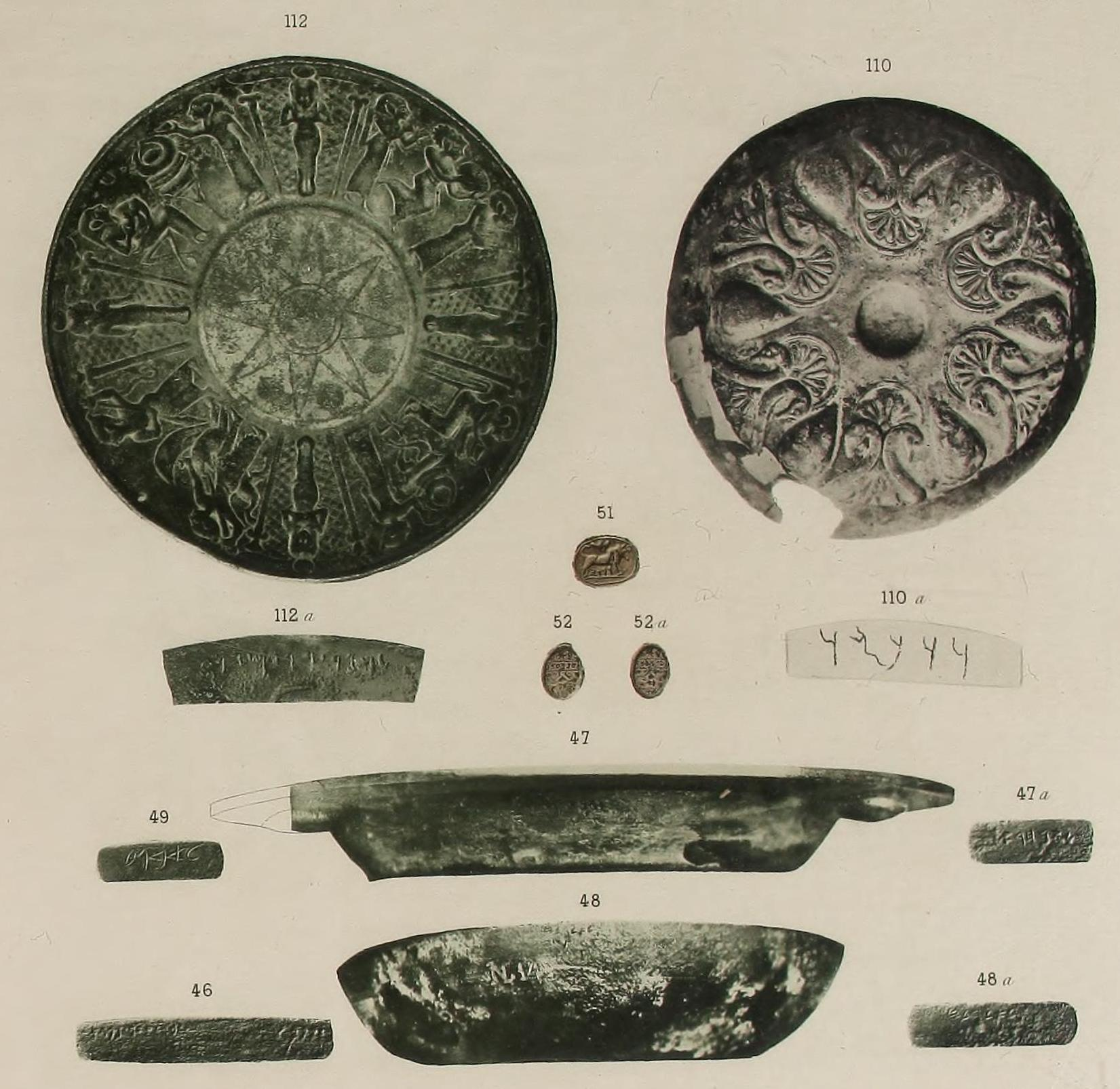
Bowls in the Corpus Inscriptionum Semiticarum II; the bottom of the page shows the sides of inscribed Nimrud bowls

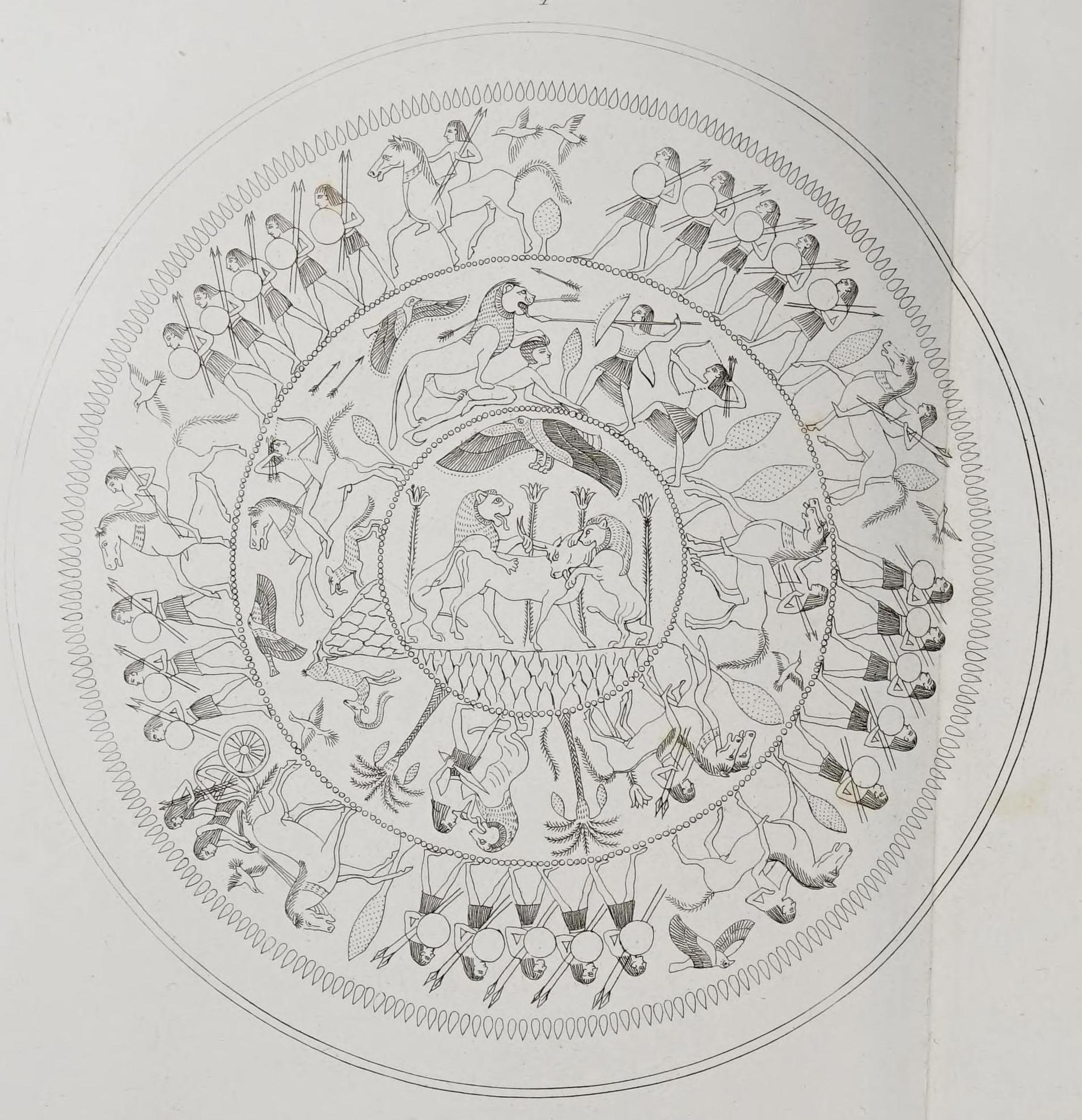
From the Regolini-Galassi tomb

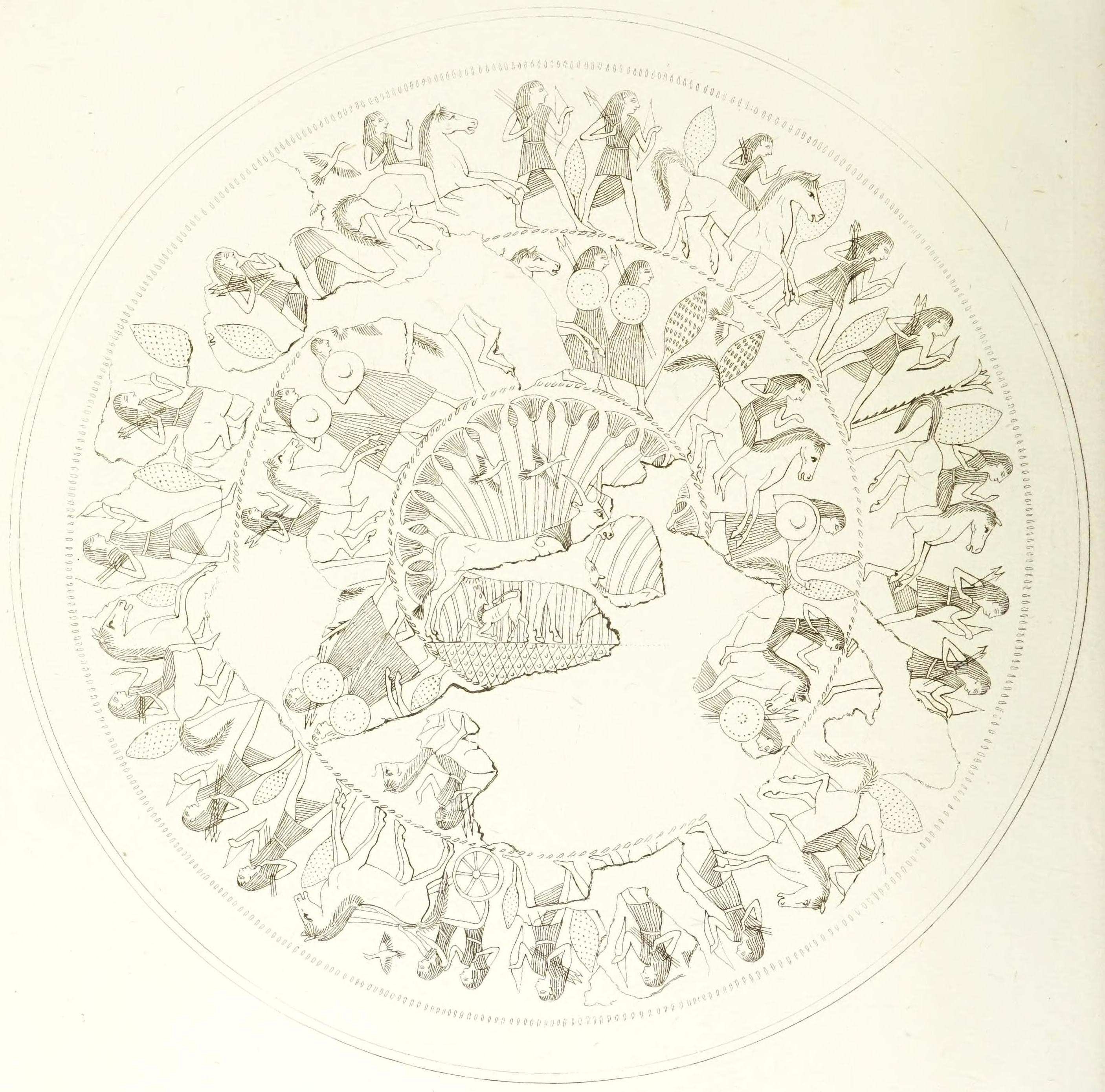
From the Regolini-Galassi tomb

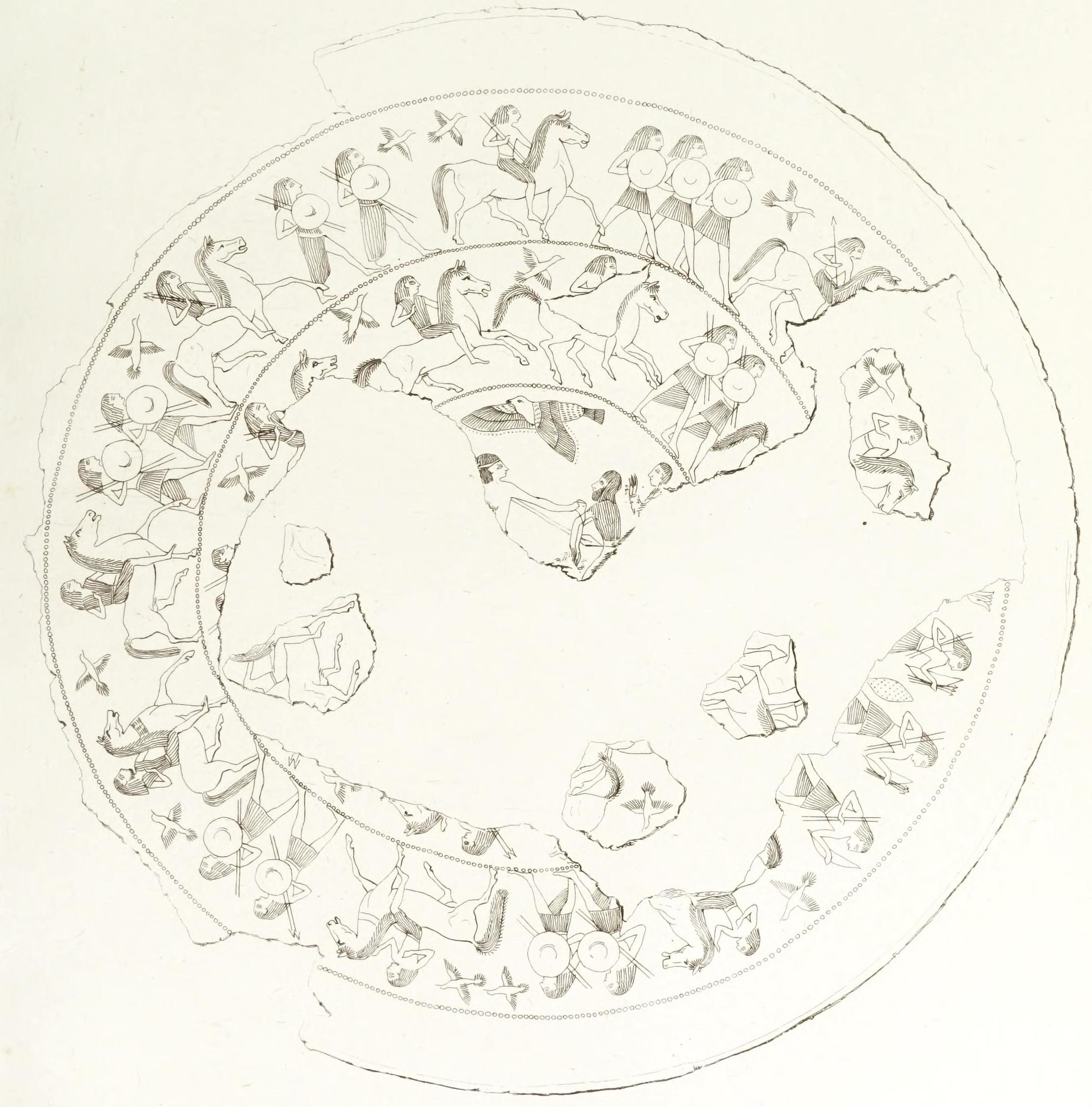
From the Regolini-Galassi tomb

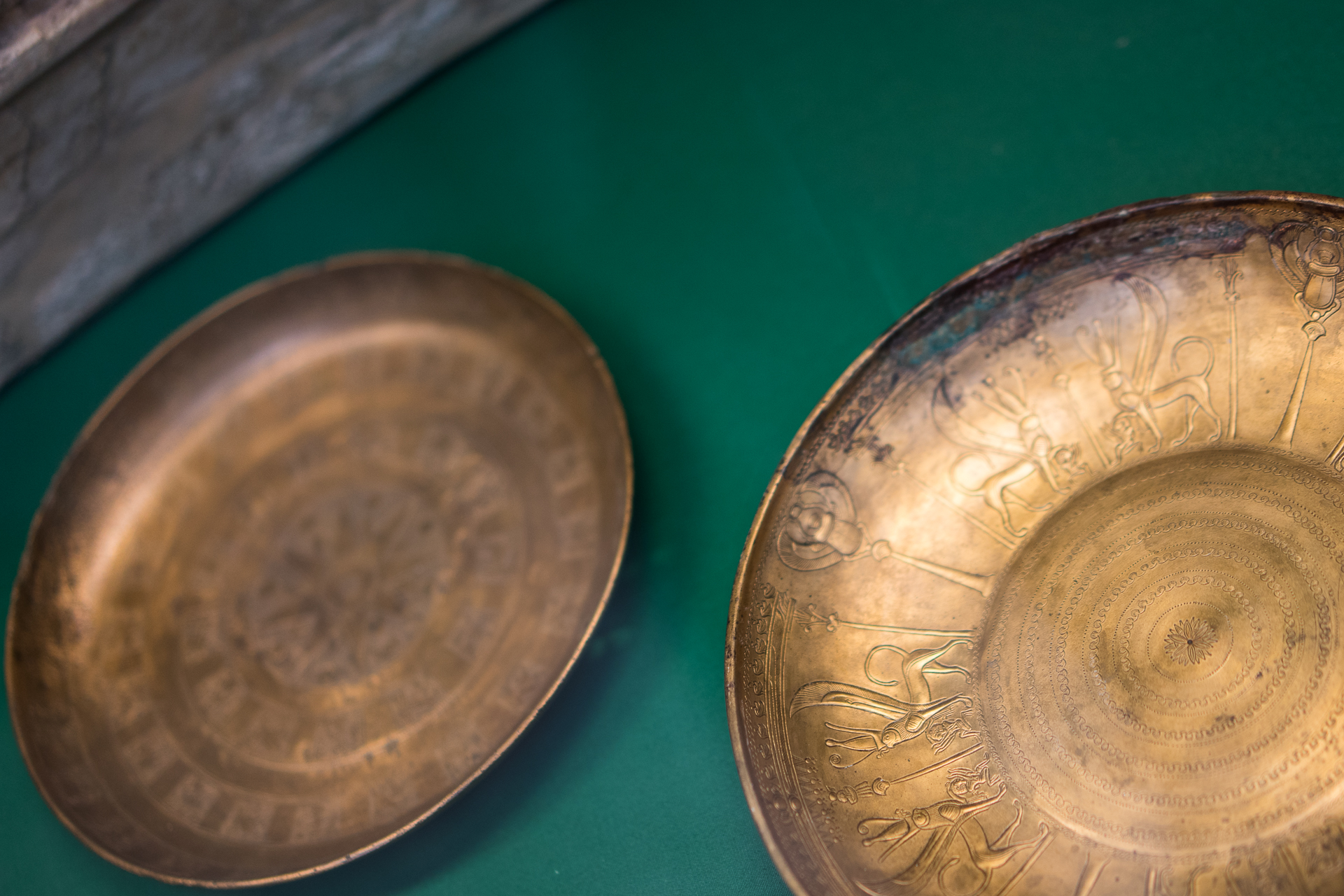
Two Phoenician bronze bowls from Nimrud on display in the British Museum

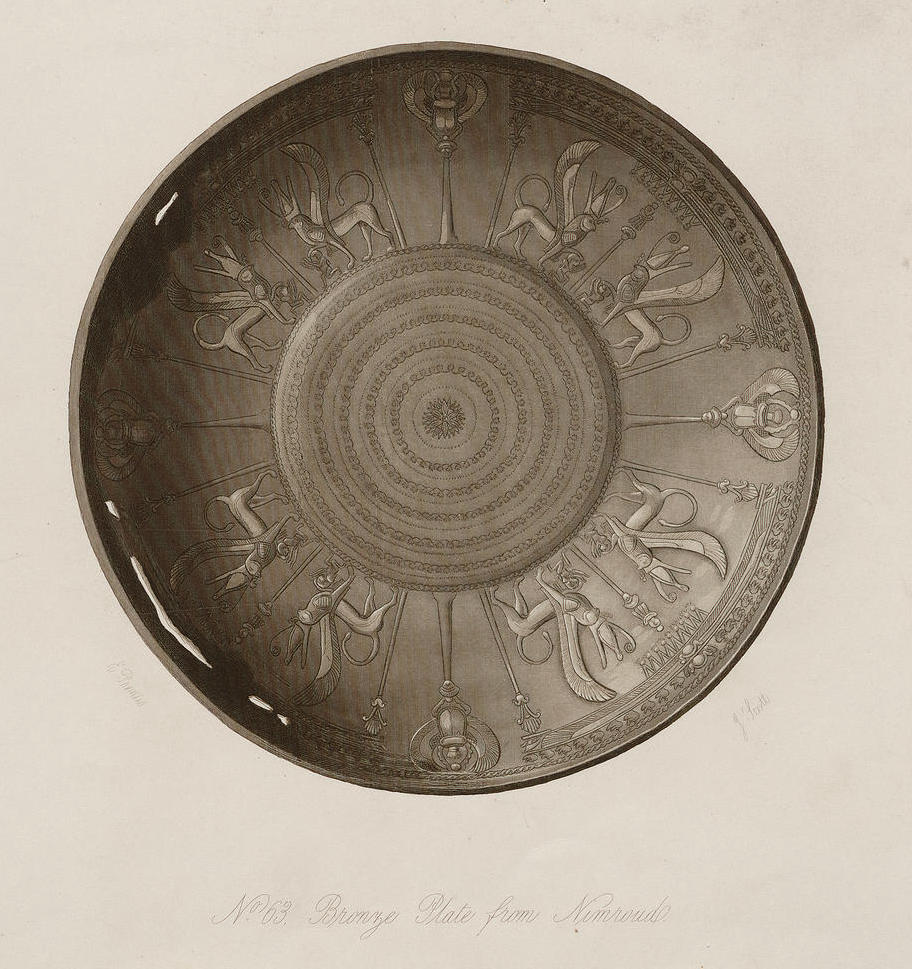
From Nimrud (see original at the British Museum: BM 115505)

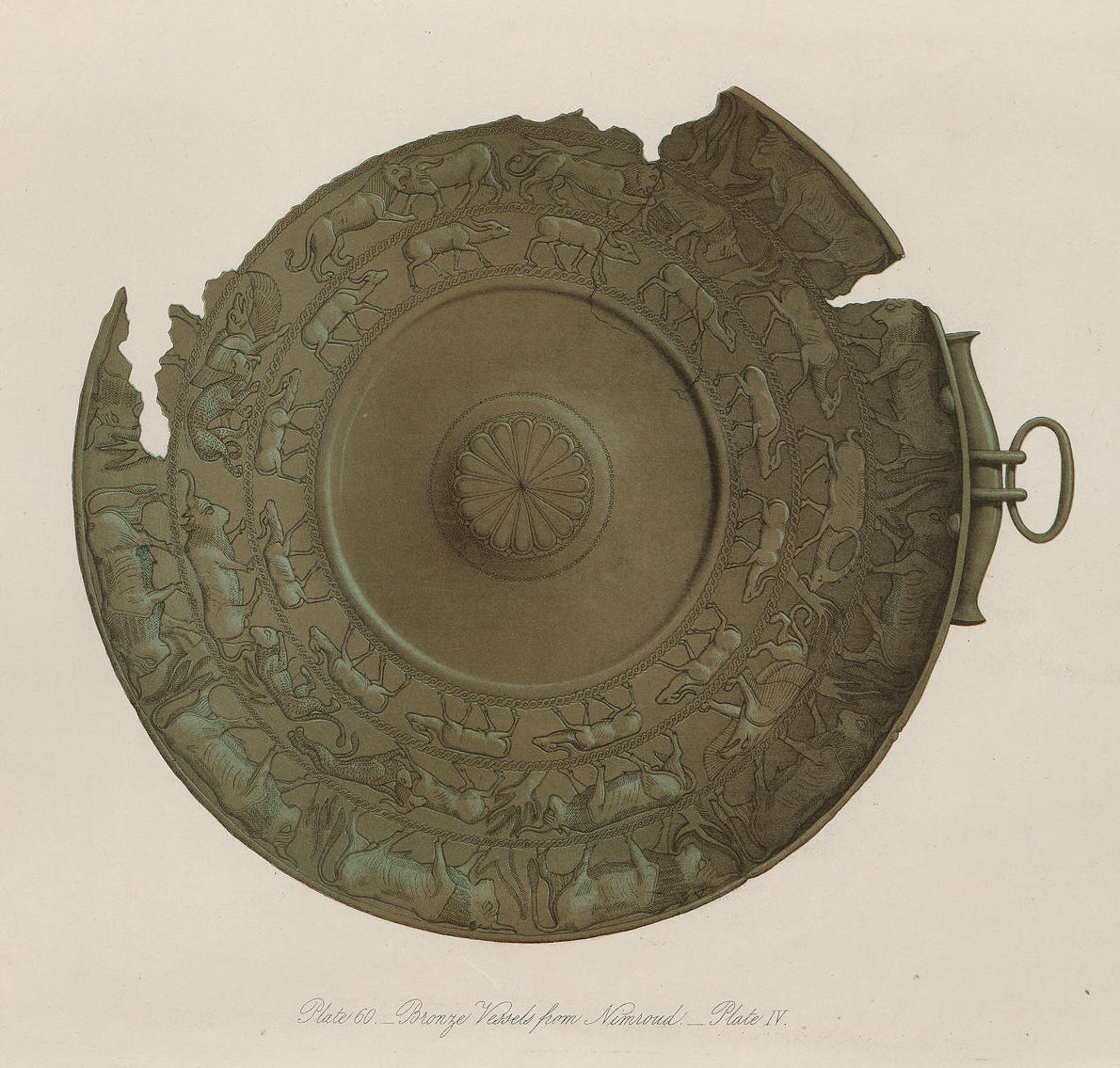
From Nimrud (see original at the British Museum: BM N.29)

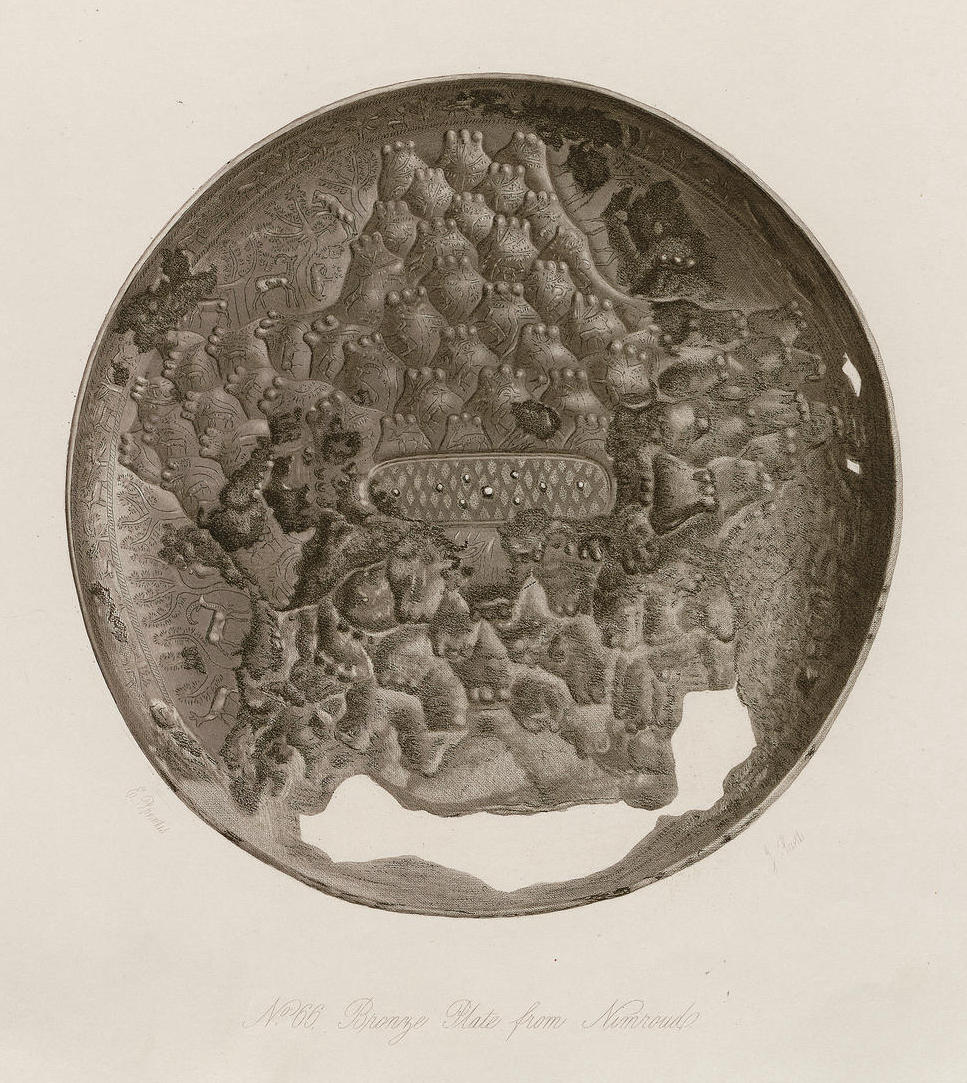
From Nimrud (see original at the British Museum: BM 115503)

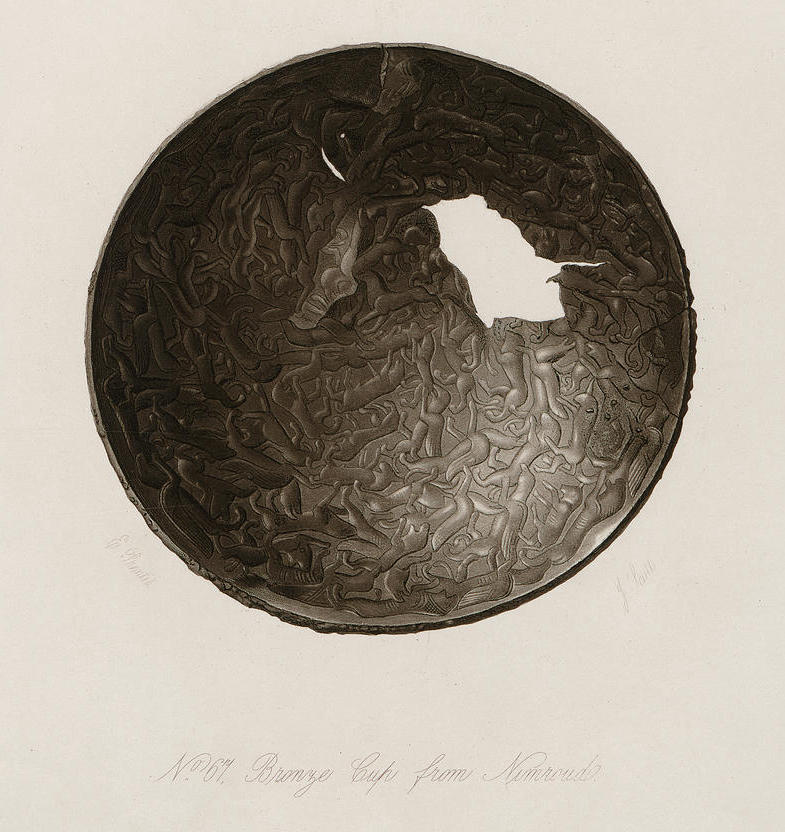
From Nimrud (see original at the British Museum: BM N.10)

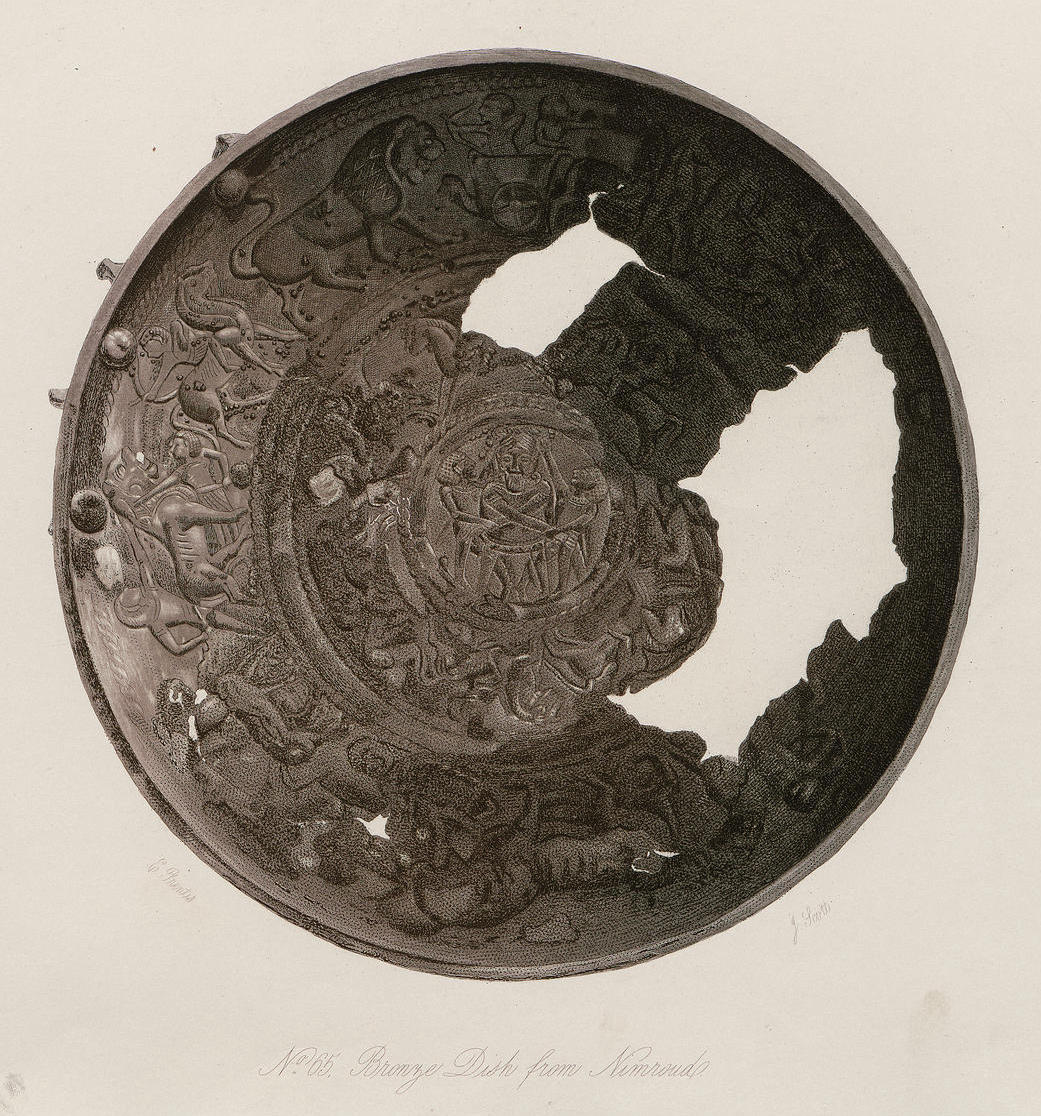
From Nimrud

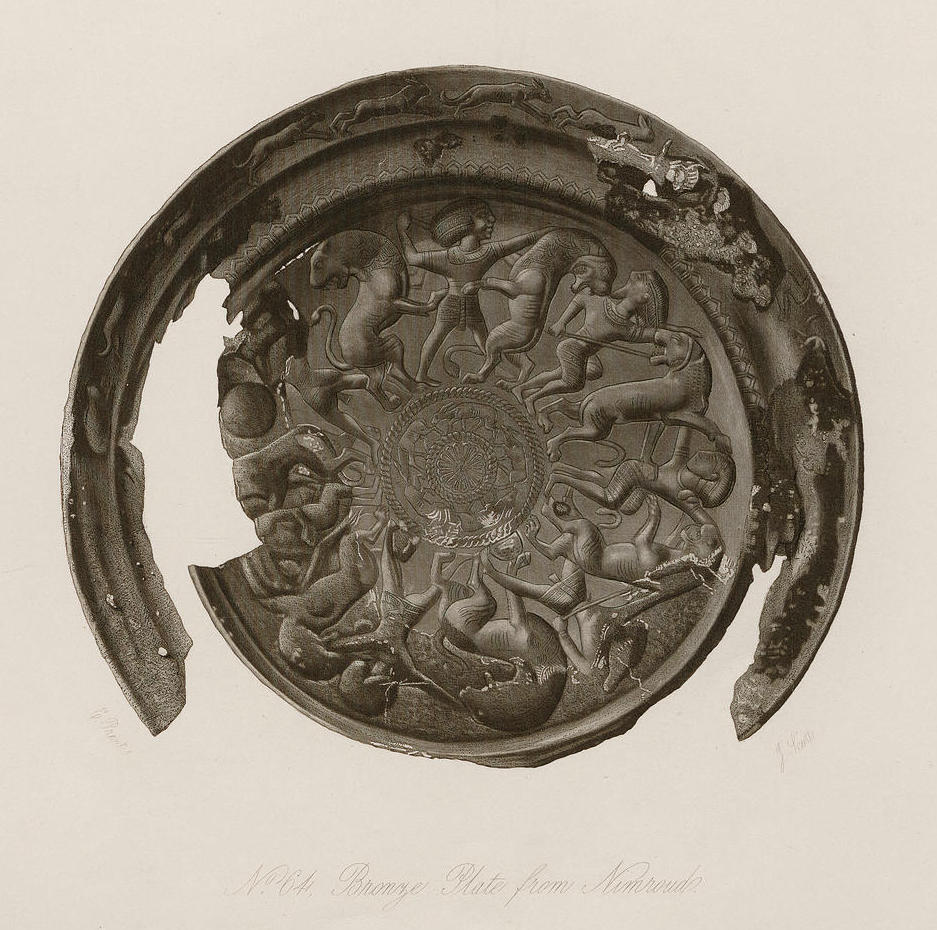
From Nimrud

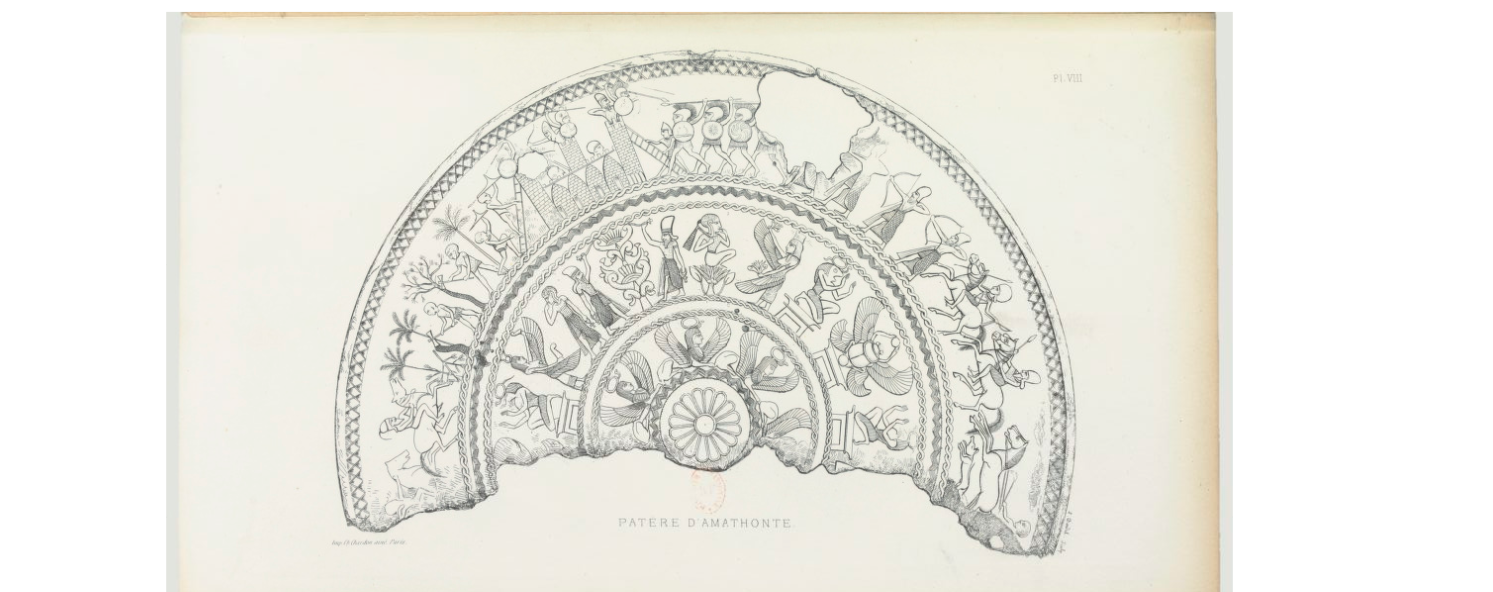
Illustration of the Amathus silver bowl in the British Museum

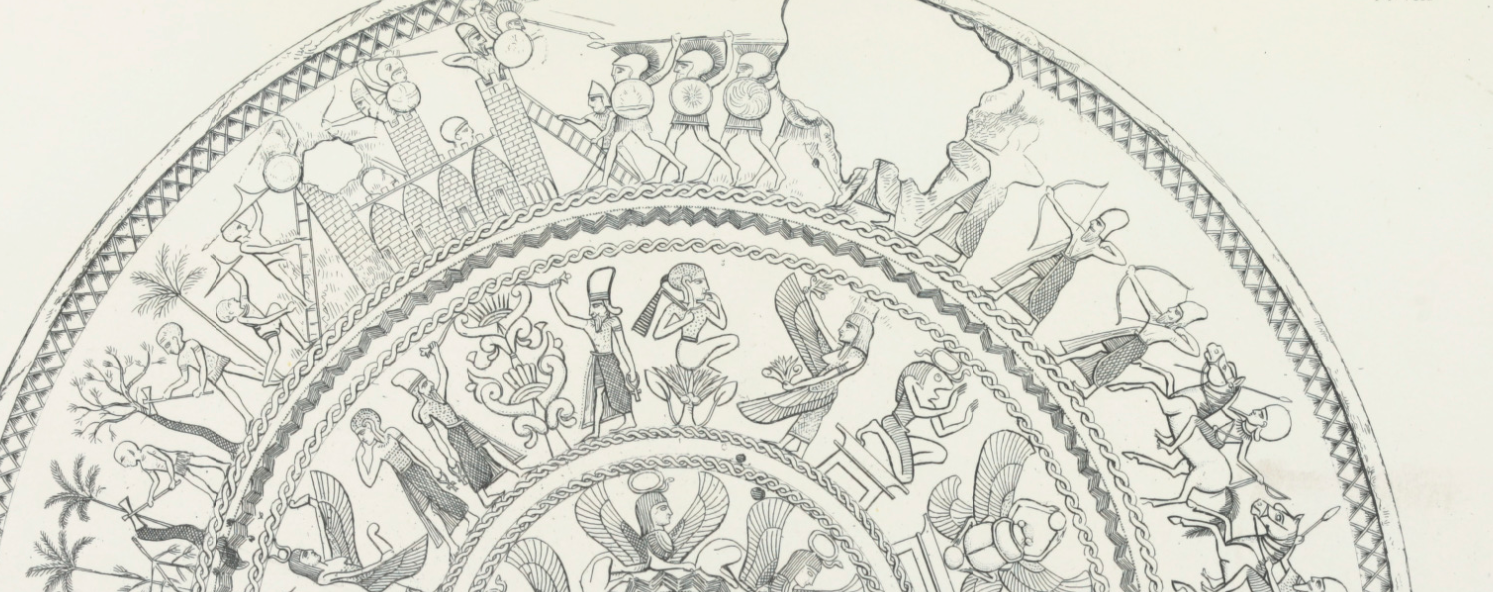
Detail of the Amathus Bowl

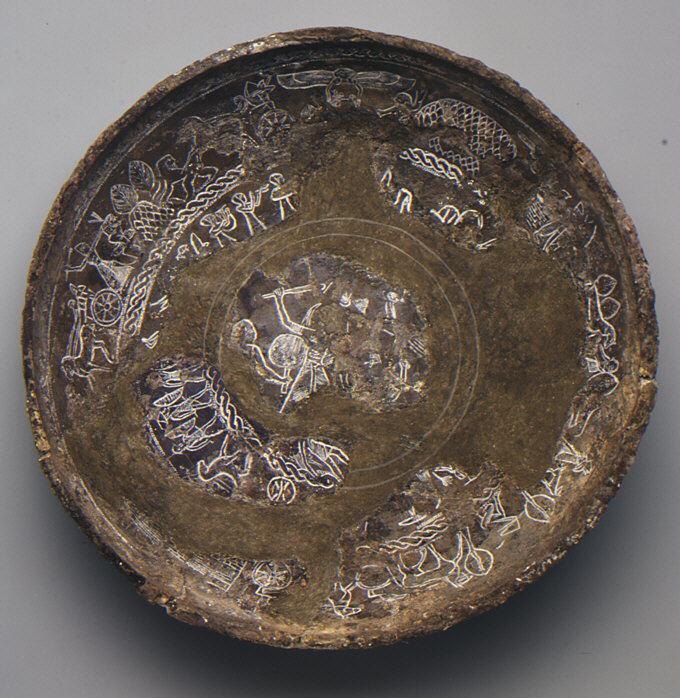
From the Cesnola collection at the Metropolitan Museum of Art

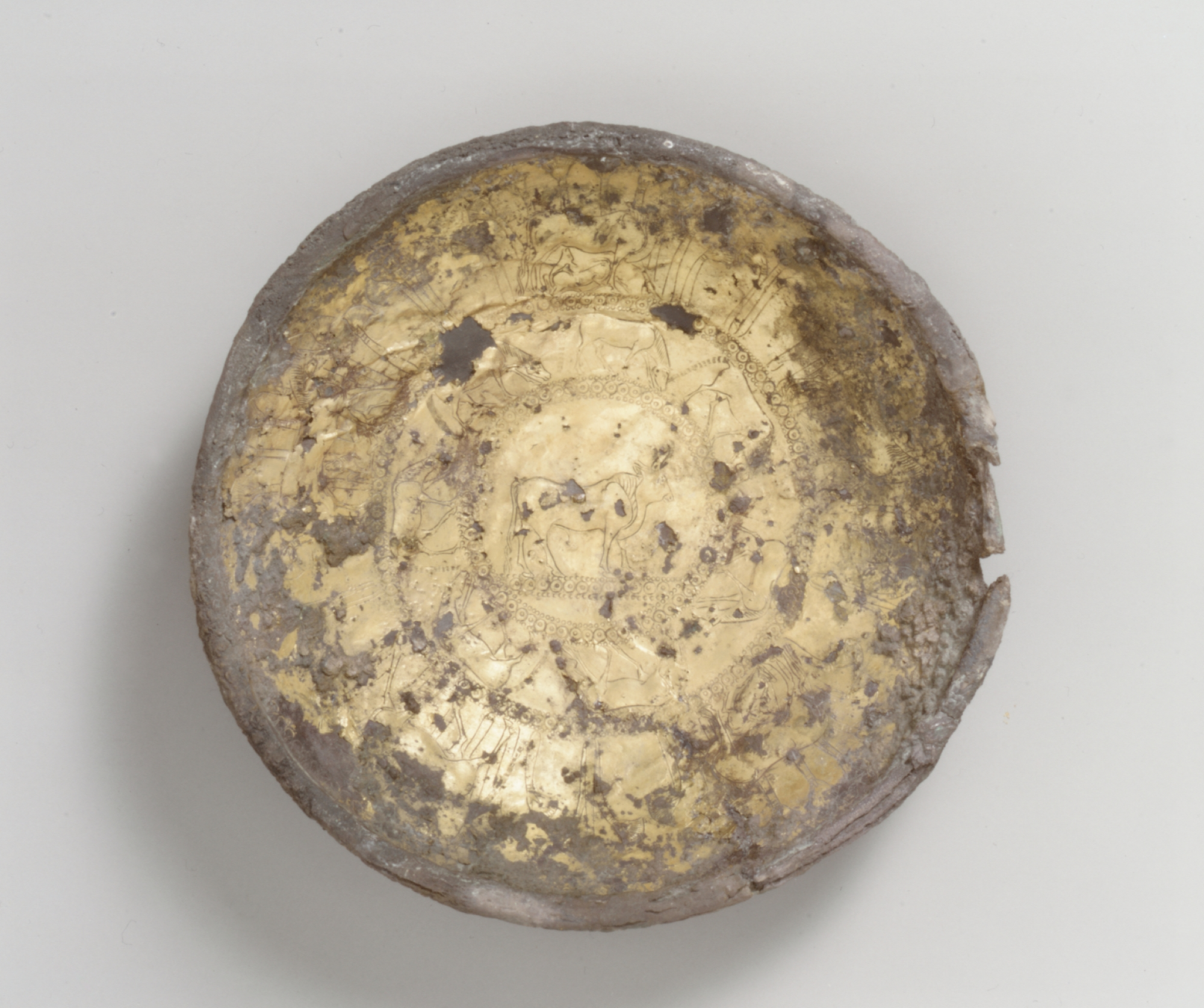
From the Cesnola collection at the Metropolitan Museum of Art

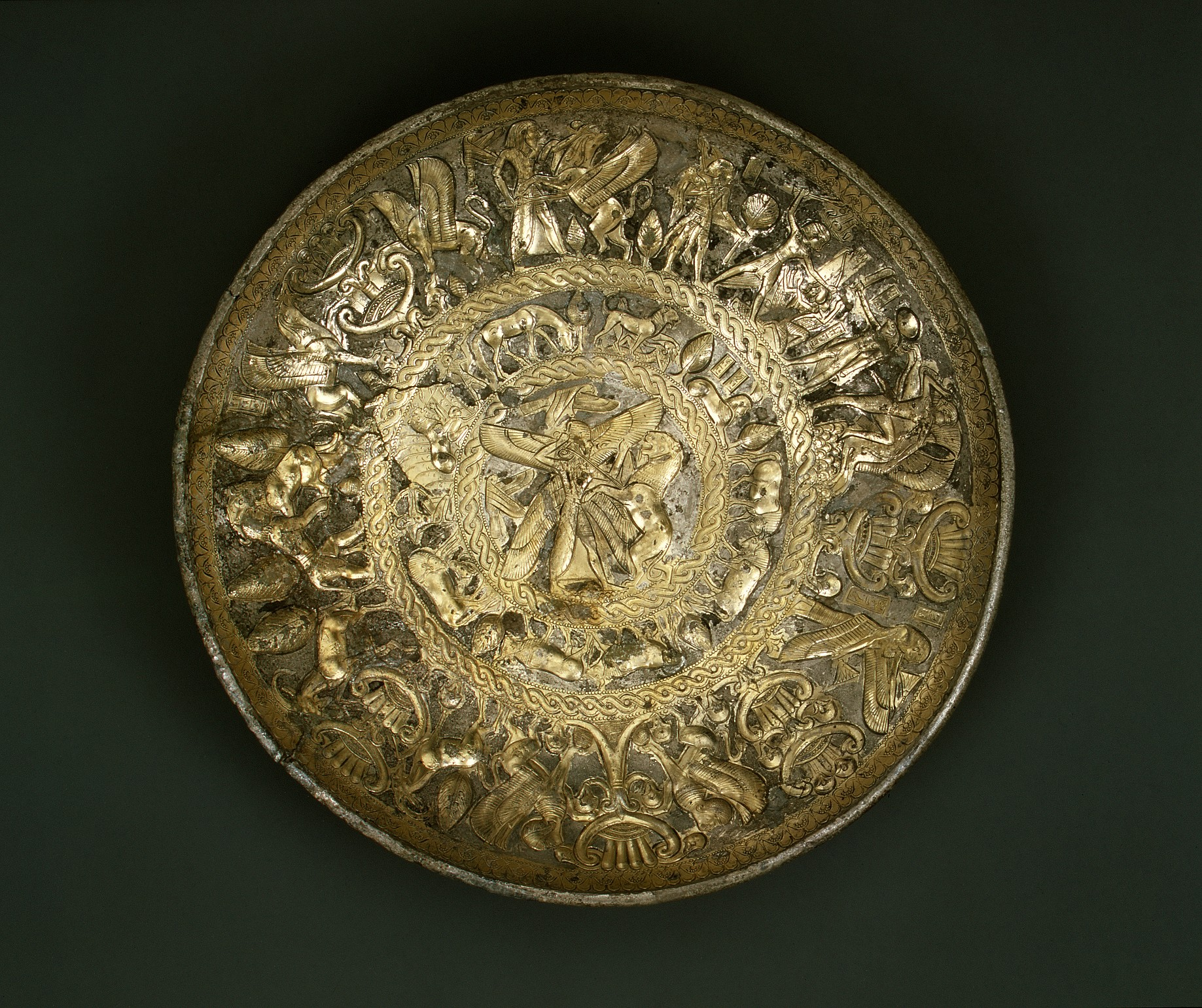
From the Cesnola collection at the Metropolitan Museum of Art

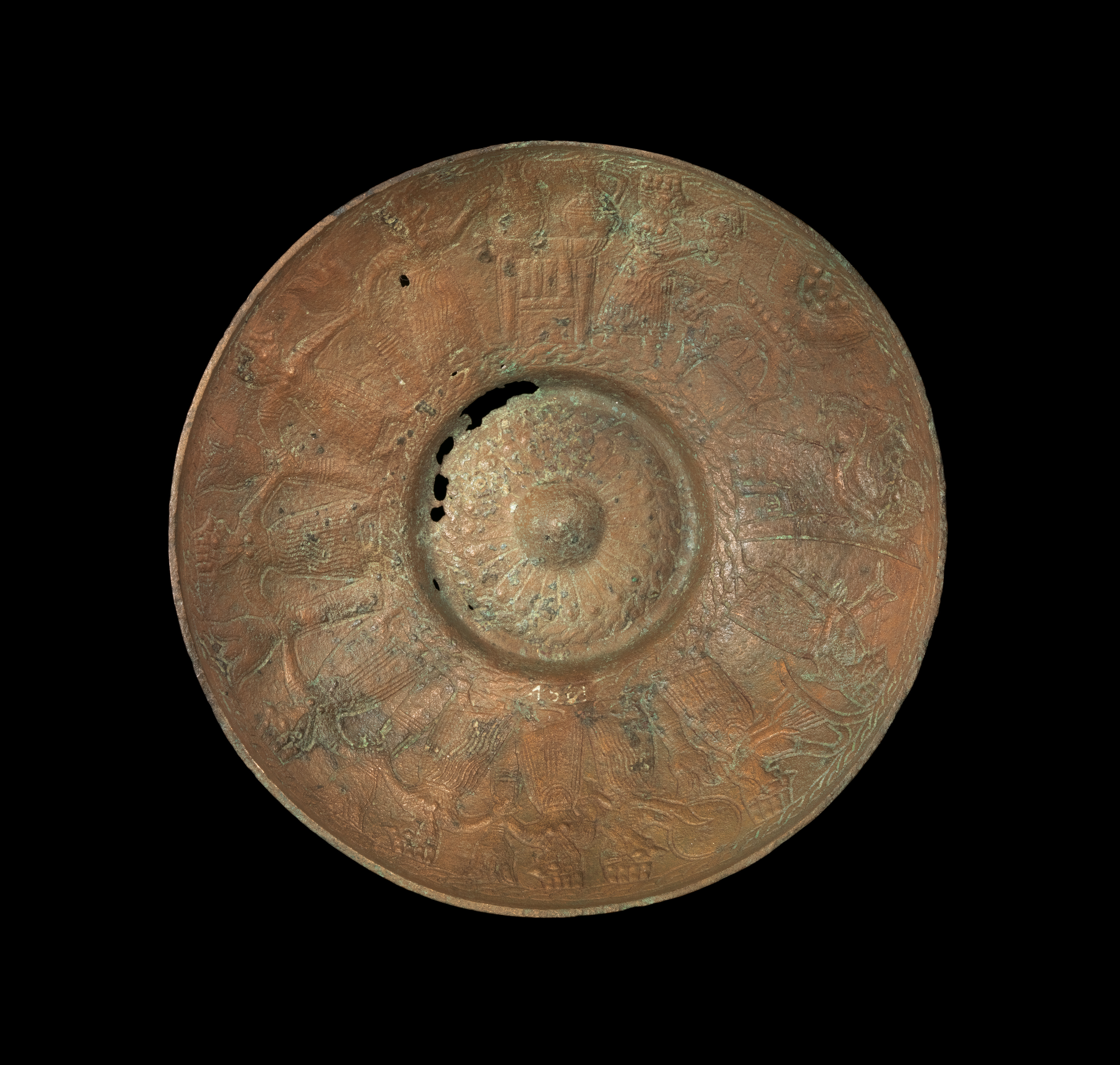
From the Cesnola collection at the Metropolitan Museum of Art

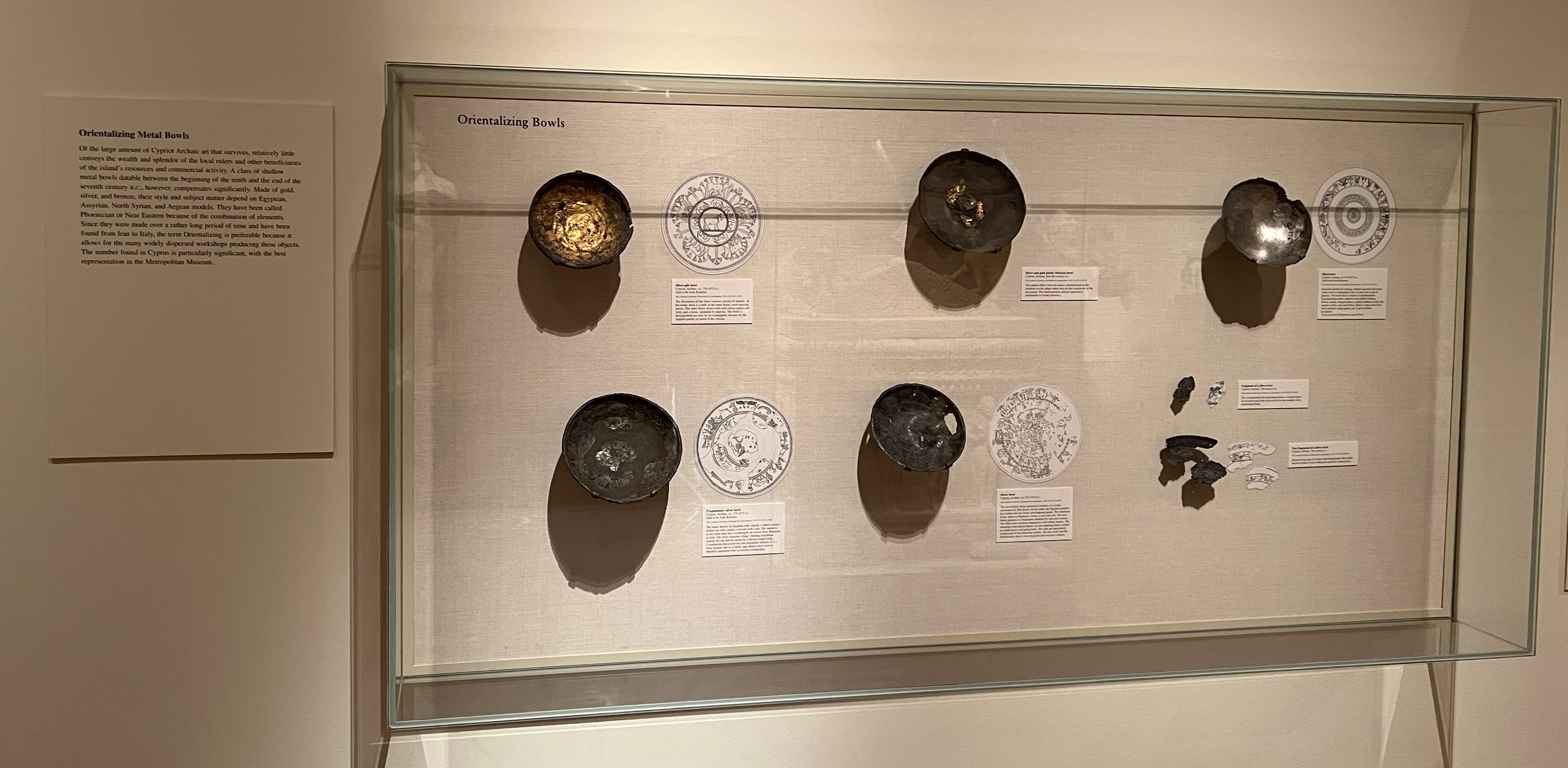
Display at the Metropolitan Museum of Art

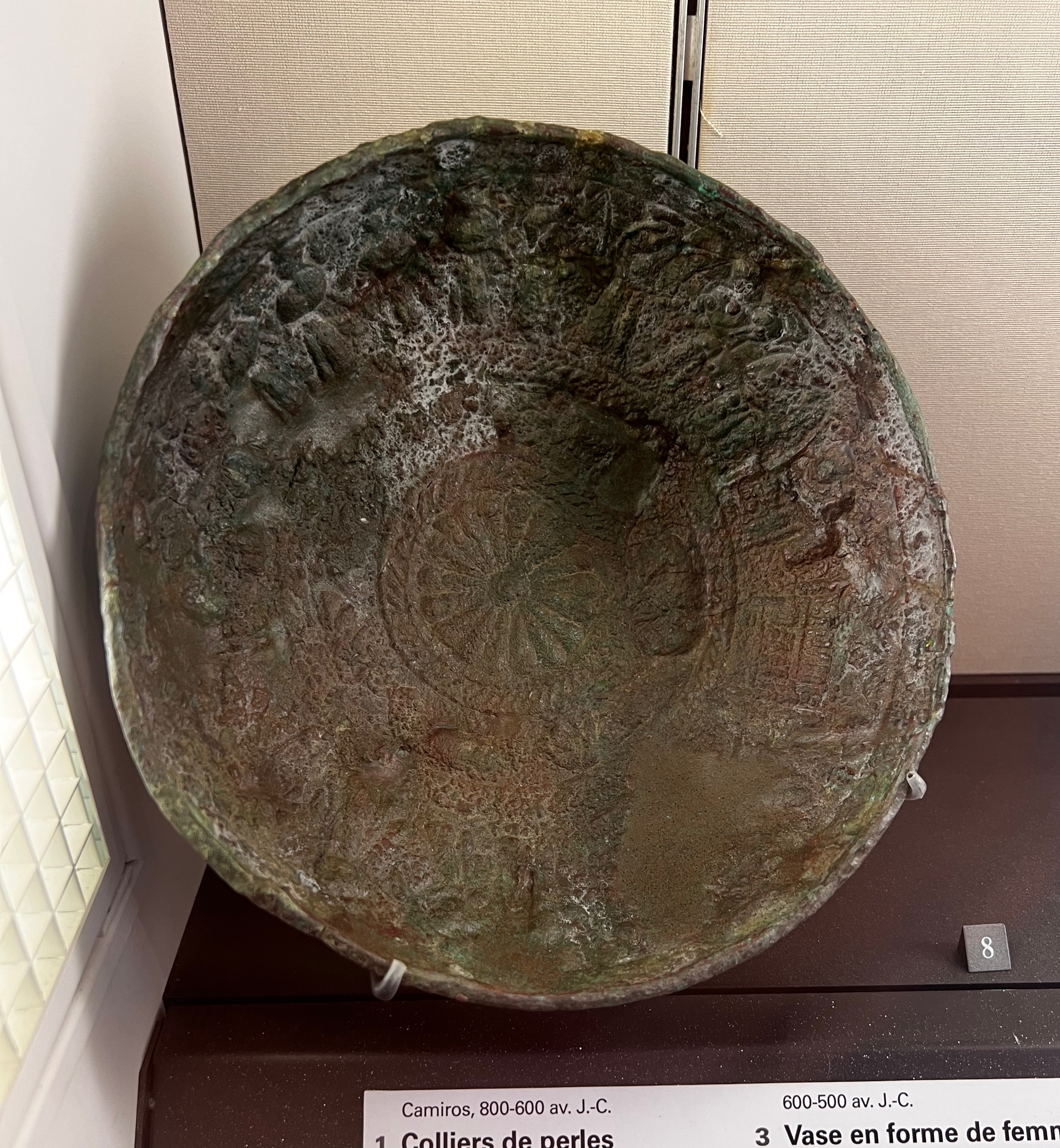
Display at the Louvre (AO 4702), from Sparta. Described as "Phoenician bowl: This bowl may be compared to the Phoenician silver bowls"

From Tamassos
