= Regolini-Galassi tomb =

Etruscan archaic tomb

Coordinates: 41.9927°N 12.0976°E

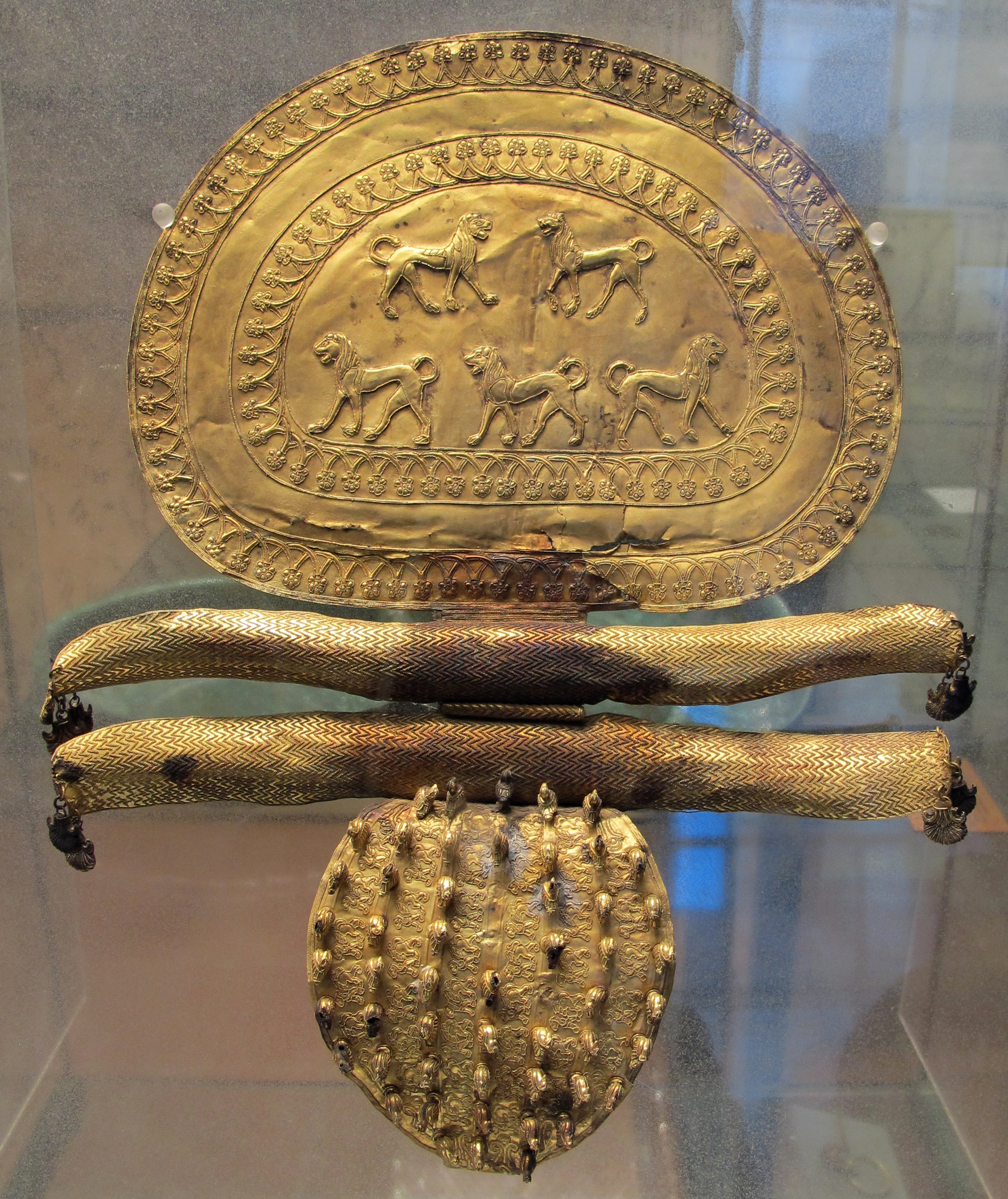
Great golden fibula, 675-650 BC

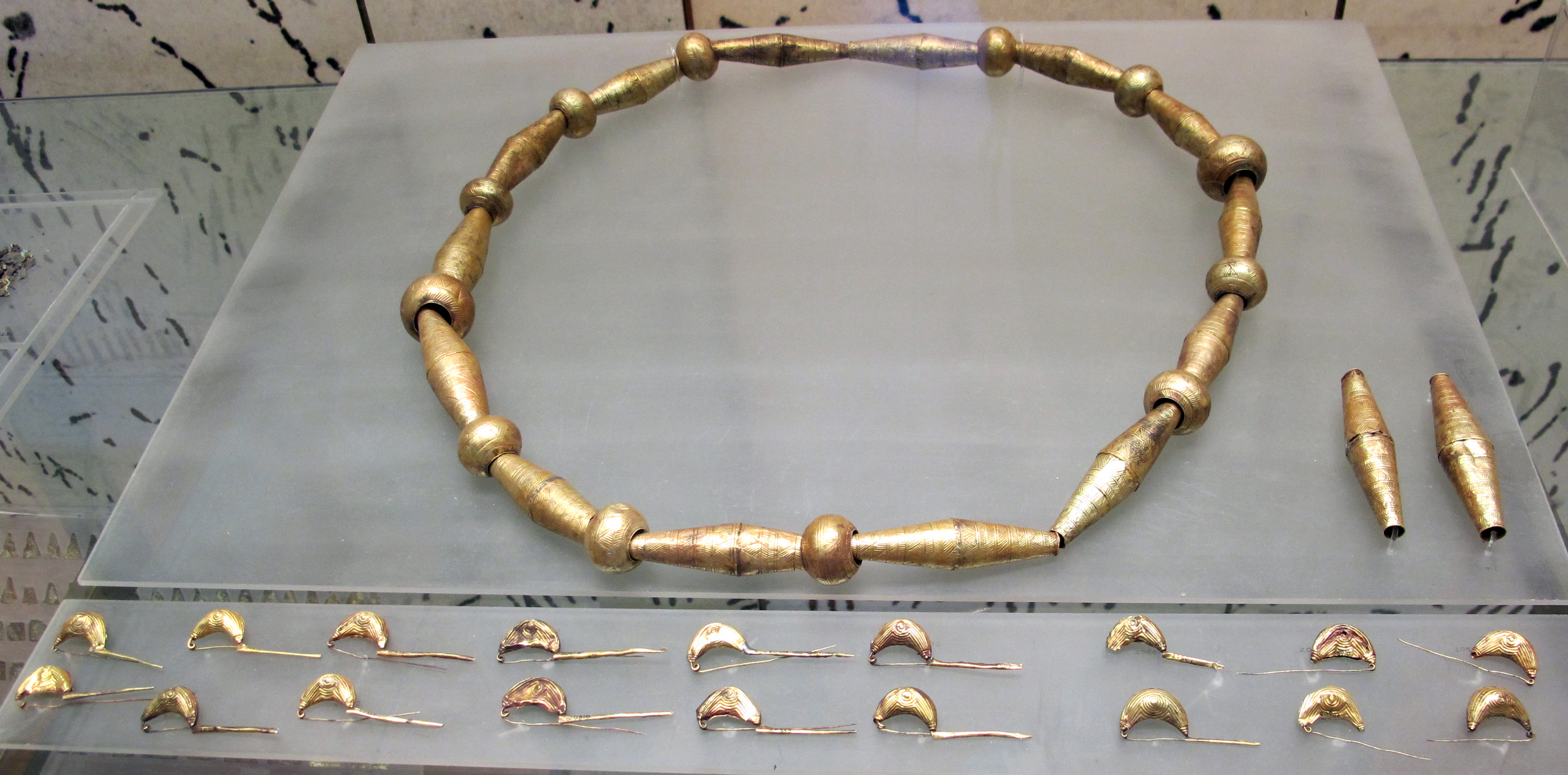
Necklace from the Regolini-Galassi tomb 675-650 BC

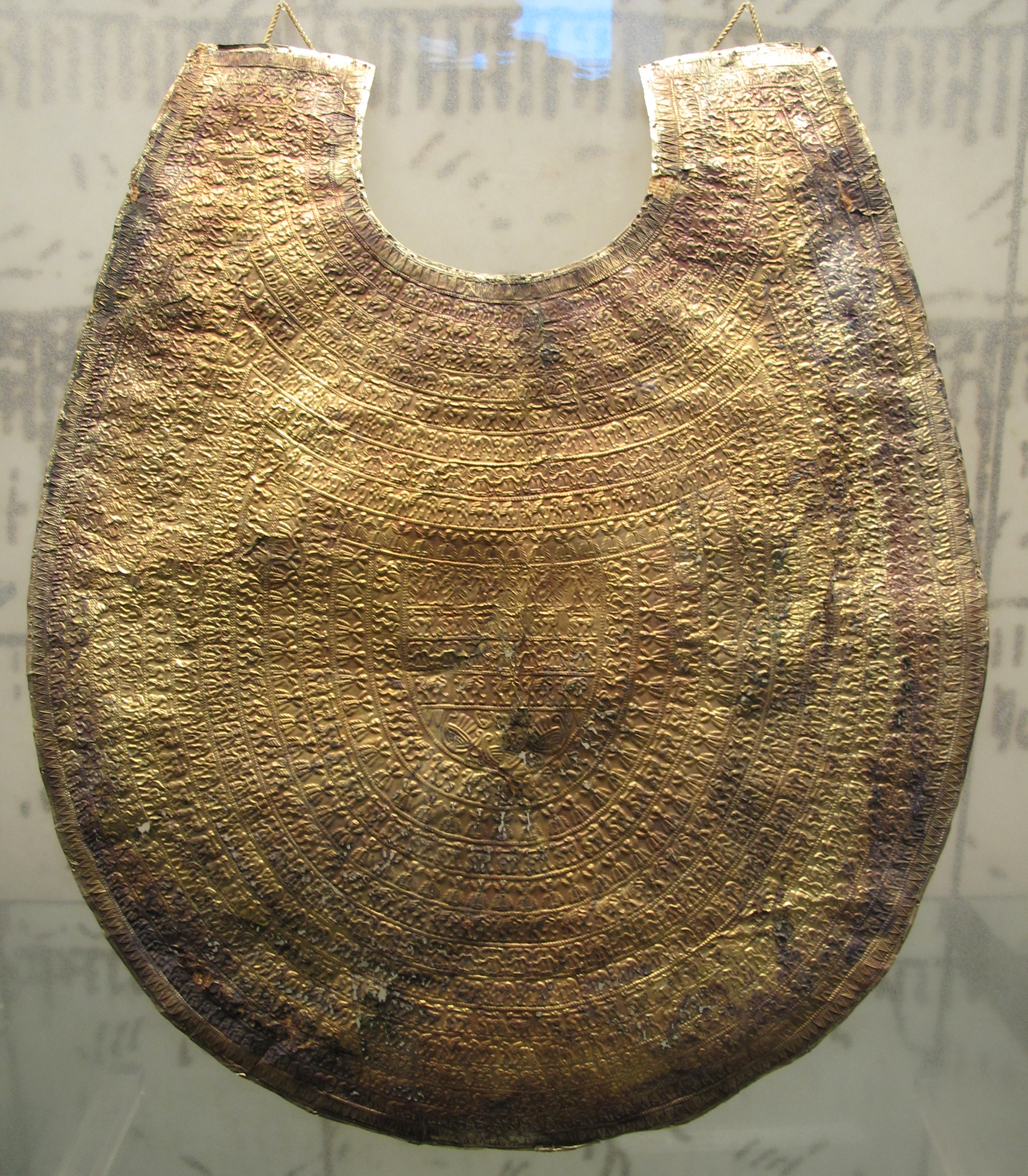
Gold pectoral from the Regolini-Galassi tomb, ca. 650 BC

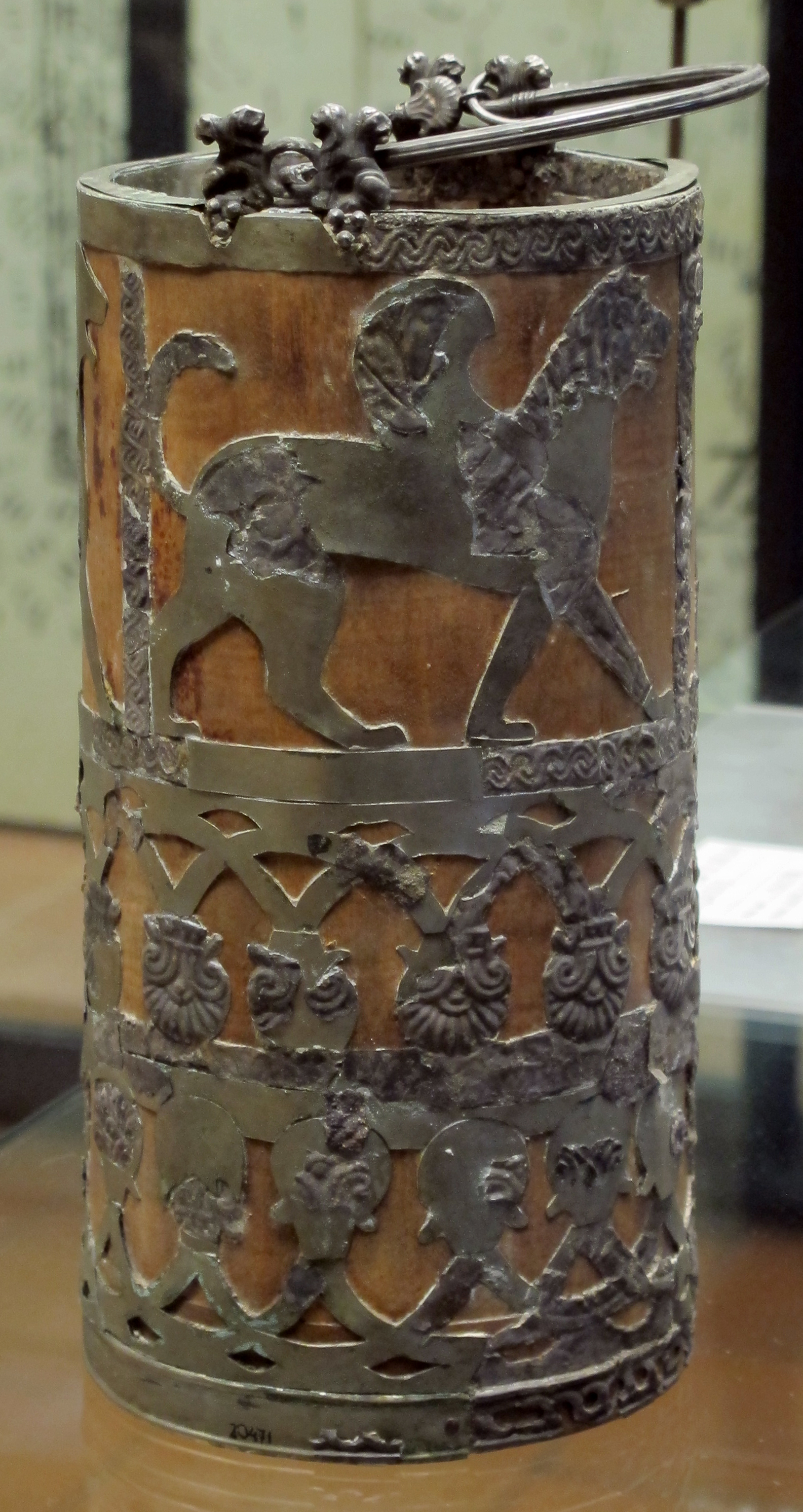
Silver vessel, 650 BC

The tomb known as the Regolini-Galassi tomb is one of the wealthiest Etruscan family tombs in Caere, an ancient city in Italy approximately 50–60 kilometres (31–37 mi) north-northwest of Rome. The tomb dates to between 680/675-650 BC. Based on the evidence of the tomb's architecture and its contents, it was built by a wealthy family of Caere. The grave goods included with the two decedents included bronze cauldrons and gold jewellery of Etruscan origin in the Oriental style. The tomb was discovered in 1836 in modern-day Cerveteri in an undisturbed condition and named after the excavators, General Vincenzo Galassi and the archpriest of Cerveteri, Alessandro Regolini. Both of these men had previous experience opening and excavating tombs in the area of Caere.

The contents of the tomb were published in detail by Luigi Grifi in 1841.

== Description ==
The tomb contains two burial chambers, located either side of a corridor 120 feet (37 m) long and 6 feet (1.8 m) wide. The lower portion of the tomb is cut into the tufa rock while the upper portion is built with square stone blocks, which has created an overhang resulting from the stone blocks extending one above the other. It is covered with a 150 feet (46 m) tumulus. The tumulus covers the entire structure giving it a facade of a monument. After the archaeological excavations of the tomb, the antiquities it contained were initially securely kept in a room in the residence of General Galassi, a key official of the papal army. The grave objects were subsequently sold to the Vatican, and are on display at the Vatican Museums' Gregorian Etruscan Museum.

Excavations at the site unearthed a royal woman buried in the end cell and a cremated man in the right-hand cell, and a wealth of items, including gold jewels, silverware, gilded and bronze ware, and a chariot. Also found on the bronze bed in an annex chamber was the body of one more person, whose identity has remained an unexplained mystery. Several of the items display seventh century BC Villanovan decorative motifs, including a great fibula, adorned with five tiny lions depicted striding across its surface, and a large 25 cm long plaque, decorated with depictions of animals of Eastern origin. The fibula has been acclaimed as masterful in technique, as have the Phoenician metal bowls.

Orientalizing influences are prominent in the tomb, fusing Etruscan customs with those of Greece and the Eastern Mediterranean. The use of many materials in the items including iron, tin, copper, silver and gold illustrates the importance of mineral wealth in the area which saw Villanovan settlements develop from poor agricultural villages into thriving cities.
