= Emanuele Rovini =

Italian footballer (born 1995)

Personal information
- Date of birth: 15 March 1995 (age 31)
- Place of birth: Marina di Cecina, Cecina, Italy
- Height: 1.70 m (5 ft 7 in)
- Position: Forward

Youth career
- Empoli
- 2013–2014: Udinese

Senior career*
Years	Team	Apps	(Gls)
2014–2020	Udinese	0	(0)
2014	→ Empoli (loan)	0	(0)
2015	→ SPAL (loan)	14	(0)
2015–2017	→ Pistoiese (loan)	57	(16)
2017–2018	→ Pro Vercelli (loan)	12	(1)
2018–2019	→ Pistoiese (loan)	4	(3)

International career
2011	Italy U16	2	(3)
2011	Italy U17	2	(0)
- * Club domestic league appearances and goals as of 2 August 2019

Emanuele Rovini (born 15 March 1995) is an Italian footballer who plays as a forward.

== Career ==
Born in Marina di Cecina, Cecina, Tuscany, Rovini started his career with Tuscan team Empoli F.C. In July 2012, Rovini was signed by Serie A club Udinese in a co-ownership deal for €800,000. Rovini spent the 2012–13 season with the Empoli youth–reserve side. During the 2013–14 season he joined the Udinese youth–reserve team.

In the summer of 2014, Rovini returned to Empoli on a temporary deal. He wore the number 95 shirt for the first team. Rovini failed to play a single game during the 2014–15 Serie A season. On 30 January 2015, Rovini was signed by SPAL, and he made his club and professional debut during the 2014–15 Lega Pro season.

In June 2015 Udinese acquired Rovini's remaining 50% registration rights from Empoli for an undisclosed fee.
