= Cecina, Tuscany =

Cecina
- Comune
- Comune di Cecina
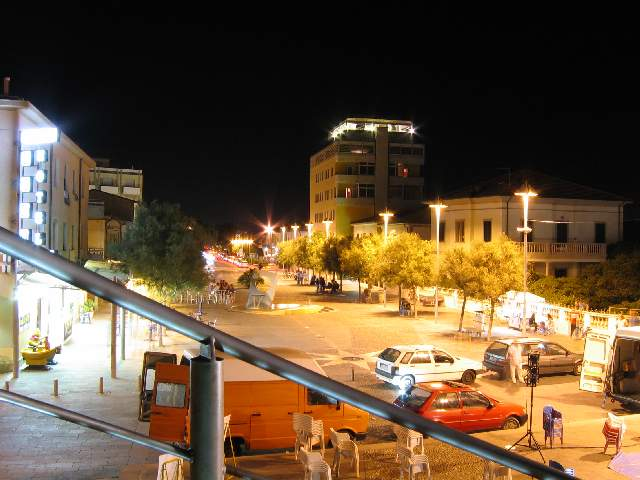

- Coat of arms

- Location within Italy Location within Tuscany
- Coordinates: 43°19′N 10°31′E
- Country: Italy
- Region: Tuscany
- Province: Livorno (LI)
- Frazioni: Collemezzano, Marina di Cecina, San Pietro in Palazzi

Government
  - Mayor: Lia Burgalassi

Area
  - Total: 42.5 km^{2} (16.4 sq mi)
- Elevation: 15 m (49 ft)

Population (January 2017)
  - Total: 28,120
  - Density: 662/km^{2} (1,710/sq mi)
- Demonym: Cecinesi
- Time zone: UTC+1 (CET)
  - Summer (DST): UTC+2 (CEST)
- Postal code: 57023
- Dialing code: 0586
- Patron saint: Saint Joseph
- Saint day: March 19
- Website: Official website

Cecina (Italian pronunciation: [ˈtʃɛːtʃina]) is a comune (municipality) of 28,322 inhabitants in the Province of Livorno, in the Italian region of Tuscany, located about 80 kilometres (50 mi) southwest of Florence and about 30 kilometres (19 mi) southeast of Livorno.

The territory of Cecina borders the following municipalities: Bibbona, Casale Marittimo, Castellina Marittima, Guardistallo, Montescudaio, Riparbella and Rosignano Marittimo.

An archaeological park close to the town houses the remains of a Roman villa from the 1st century BC.

== History ==
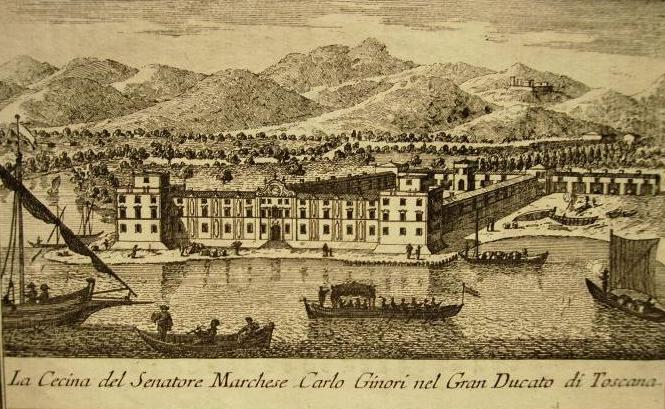
View of Cecina River, 1751

A settlement was founded here by the Roman consul Albinus Caecina, who was a descendant of an ancient Etruscan family. After the fall of the Western Roman Empire, the territory suffered a long period of decline, which only came to an end when the Grand Duke Leopold II of Tuscany began to develop local agriculture.

The modern town was founded in 1852, but a part of the city was destroyed during World War II. From the 1960s onwards, it has developed into a popular tourist resort.

== Twin towns ==
- Gilching, Germany, since 1989
- Sagunto, Spain
- Sin-le-Noble, France
