= San Pietro in Palazzi =

- Frazione
- View of the town behind olive groves

- Location of San Pietro in Palazzi in Italy
- Coordinates: 43°19′37″N 10°30′26″E
- Country: Italy
- Region: Tuscany
- Province: Livorno (LI)
- Comune: Cecina
- Elevation: 12 m (39 ft)

Population (2011)
  - Total: 3,141
- Time zone: UTC+1 (CET)
  - Summer (DST): UTC+2 (CEST)
- Postal code: 57023
- Dialing code: (+39) 0586

San Pietro in Palazzi is a town in Tuscany, central Italy, administratively a frazione of the comune of Cecina, province of Livorno. At the time of the 2011 census its population was 3,141.

The town is about 33 km from Livorno and 2 km from Cecina.

== Bibliography ==
- S. Mordhorst (1996). Guida alla Val di Cecina. Siena.
