= Collemezzano =

- Frazione
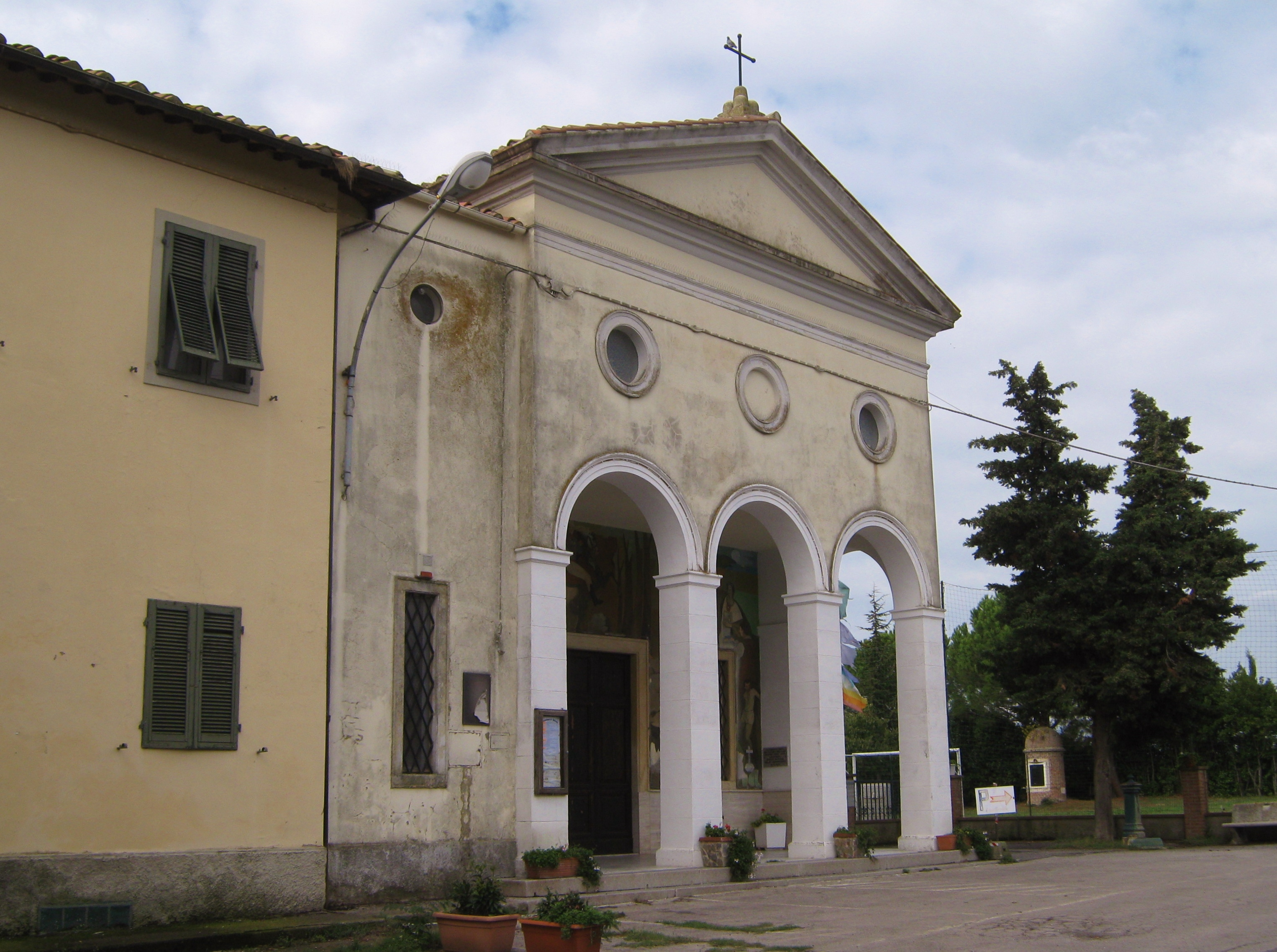
- The church of Sant'Antonio

- Location of Collemezzano in Italy
- Coordinates: 43°21′21″N 10°31′43″E
- Country: Italy
- Region: Tuscany
- Province: Livorno (LI)
- Comune: Cecina
- Elevation: 70 m (230 ft)

Population (2011)
  - Total: 14
- Time zone: UTC+1 (CET)
  - Summer (DST): UTC+2 (CEST)
- Postal code: 57023
- Dialing code: (+39) 0586

Collemezzano is a village in Tuscany, central Italy, administratively a frazione of the comune of Cecina, province of Livorno. At the time of the 2011 census its population was 14.

Collemezzano is about 35 km from Livorno and 6 km from Cecina.

== Bibliography ==
- S. Mordhorst (1996). Guida alla Val di Cecina. Siena.
