= Marina di Cecina =

- Frazione
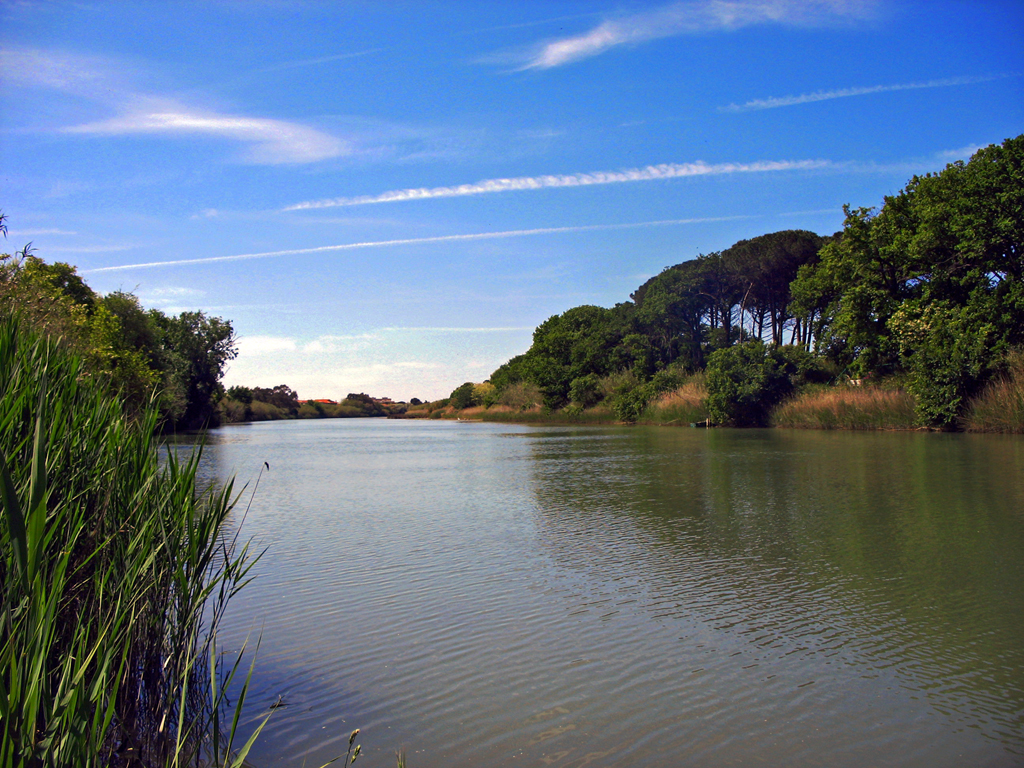

- Location of Marina di Cecina in Italy
- Coordinates: 43°17′58″N 10°29′37″E
- Country: Italy
- Region: Tuscany
- Province: Livorno (LI)
- Comune: Cecina
- Elevation: 2 m (6.6 ft)

Population
  - Total: 2,000
- Time zone: UTC+1 (CET)
  - Summer (DST): UTC+2 (CEST)
- Postal code: 57023
- Dialing code: (+39) 0586

Marina di Cecina is a town in Tuscany, central Italy, administratively a frazione of the comune of Cecina, province of Livorno. At the time of the 2016 parish census its population was 2,000.

== Bibliography ==
- S. Mordhorst (1996). Guida alla Val di Cecina. Siena.
