= Business Information Technology Institute =

German research institute

BIT – Business Information Technology Institute
- Abbreviation: BIT
- Formation: 2007
- Type: GmbH
- Purpose: Research
- Location: Mannheim, Baden-Wuerttemberg, Germany
- Region served: Europe, Germany
- Director: Franz Steffens
- Affiliations: University of Mannheim
- Staff: 20
- Website: bit-institute.com

The BIT – Business Information Technology Institute in Mannheim, Germany is a computer science and information systems research institute and affiliated with University of Mannheim. Under the leadership of Franz Steffens, president of the institute, BIT employs a staff of about 20 researchers. The BIT was established in Mannheim in 2007 and is still headquartered there. BIT is organized as a research group within the University of Mannheim and belongs to the Mannheim School of Computer Science and Mathematics. The institute addresses standard business application software and perceives itself as a mediator between science and enterprise practice.

== Organization ==
The BIT Institute headed by Professor Dr. Franz Steffens. It is located on the 4th floor of the Haus Oberrhein directly by Mannheims river bank. The BIT is subdivided into 3 pillars:

- Application Development I (large scale industry) where BIT is engaged in: Template based SAP ERP rollout; Knowledge Management in the Intranet; Data migration in SAP ERP; Enterprise Management; Building of a global Internet Platform
- Application Development II (medium-sized business) where BIT is working on: Adoption of a company wide business intelligence solution under usage of SAP NetWeaver BW; Implementation of customized scenarios for the management and operational reporting from the following fields of activity: Supply Chain Management, Finance and Controlling, Sales/Distribution and Production
- Software Lab where BIT installs prototypes analyzing software products under consideration of: Functionality, Architecture, Usability and Integration

== Research and Focus ==
The BIT Institute is focused on projects for organizational development and software rollouts in industry companies and projects in the area of developing standard business application systems with software vendors. The main focus of Research Group Information Systems is the comparative analysis of standard enterprise application systems, primarily under the consideration of technical and functional aspects. This includes systems concerning Enterprise Resource Planning (ERP). Here, the BIT is engaged in several research areas that are divided into six different research clusters:

- Business intelligence (BI)
- Customer Relationship Management (CRM)
- Enterprise Application Integration (EAI)
- Supply Chain Management (SCM)
- Supplier Relationship Management (SRM)
- Workflow Management (WfM)

== See also ==
- Mannheim
- University of Mannheim
