= Dieter Roth (political scientist) =

German political scientist

- Born: 1938 (age 87–88); Germany
- Occupation: Adjunct Professor of Political Science

Dieter Roth (born 1938 in Germany) is Adjunct Professor of Political Science at the Faculty of Economic and Social Sciences of the University of Heidelberg.

== Education ==
Roth studied Sociology, Political Science and Economics at the Universities of Heidelberg, Frankfurt/Main, Mannheim, Michigan/Ann Arbor and at Cornell University. Roth obtained his doctorate degree in political science from the University of Mannheim. He also received an honorary doctorate from the University of Heidelberg.

== Career ==
After obtaining his Ph.D. he worked as Assistant Professor of Political Science at the University of Mannheim under Rudolf Wildenmann. In 1974, Dieter Roth co-founded the Forschungsgruppe Wahlen, a leading German political polling group. He has been a board member and shareholder in the Institut für Praxisorientierte Sozialforschung (ipos). Due to his work with the Forschungsgruppe Wahlen as a primary partner of Channel 2 (ZDF) television in the area of political polling, spanning a period of more than thirty years, Dieter Roth is one of the most widely known poll experts in Germany. Since 1999, Roth has been Adjunct Professor of Political Science at the University of Heidelberg.

== Publications (selection) ==
- with Bernhard Kornelius. Bundestagswahl 2005: Rot-Grün abgewählt. Verlierer bilden die Regierung, in: Christoph Egle/Reimut Zohlnhöfer (eds.). Ende des rot-grünen Projekts. Eine Bilanz der Regierung Schröder 2002-2005, Wiesbaden: VS Verlag, 2007, pp. 29–59.
- A pesquisa eleitoral na Alemanha (Electoral research in Germany), Analise Social, 2003 Summer; XXXVII(167): 533-543.
- Strategien und Praxis in Wahlkampagnen aus der Sicht der Wahlforschung, Forschungsjournal neue soziale Bewegungen, 2003 January; 16(1): 25-27.
- Die Bundestagswahl 1998 – eine Schlüsselwahl?, Derlien/Murswieck (eds.). Regieren nach Wahlen, Opladen 2000.
- Die Wahlen zur Volkskammer in der DDR. Der Versuch einer Erklärung, Politische Vierteljahresschrift, 1990, September; 31(3): 369- 393.
- Empirische Wahlforschung (Engl.: Empirical Election Research), Opladen: Leske und Budrich, 1998.
- Where is Germany heading? A public opinion perspective 1990-1998, In: Between Bonn and Berlin: German politics adrift. Oxford: Rowman & Littlefield, 1999.
- Wahlverhalten in den ostdeutschen Bundeslandern. Eine Replik auf Thomas von Winters Erklarungsmodelle in Heft 2/96, Zeitschrift für Parlamentsfragen, 1996, August 27(3): 519-520.
- Zur wahlsoziologischen Bedeutung eines Modells sozialstrukturell verankerter Konfliktlinien im vereinten Deutschland, Historical Social Research, 1995, 20(2(74)): 119-160.
- Volksparteien in crisis? The electoral successes of the extreme right in context, German Politics, 1992, April, 2(1): 1-20.
- The German Federal Elections 1987. Voters, Attitudes and Parties, in: American Politics and Society 11, 4/87.
- Ökonomische Variablen und Wahlverhalten, in: Politische Vierteljahresschrift, 14, 1973.
- Ökonomische Situation und Wahlverhalten: Das Beispiel Arbeitslosigkeit, in: Politische Vierteljahresschrift, 18, 1977.
