= Knut Borchardt =

German academic (1929–2023)

- Born: 2 June 1929; Berlin, Brandenburg, Prussia, Germany
- Died: 5 February 2023 (aged 93); Munich, Bavaria, Germany
- Education: LMU Munich
- Awards: Merit Cross 1st Class, Gottfried Wilhelm Leibniz Prize, Honorary doctorates from the University of Mannheim, the University of Innsbruck and the University of Passau
- Scientific career
- Fields: History, Economics
- Workplaces: LMU Munich; University of Mannheim; University of Tübingen

Knut Borchardt (2 June 1929 – 5 February 2023) was a German researcher, historian and former professor for history and economics at both LMU Munich and the University of Mannheim from 1962 to 1991. Moreover, he served as rector at the University of Mannheim between 1967 and 1969.

== Education ==
Borchardt was born in Berlin, Germany. He studied from 1949 to 1954 economics, business administration, history and German studies at LMU Munich where he obtained his Diplom (former German master's equivalent) in 1954. Afterwards, he obtained his doctorate in economics and his habilitation in 1961 at LMU.

== Academics ==
Borchardt worked from 1961 to 1962 as assistant professor at the University of Tübingen. After a proposal in 1962, he became professor for economics and history at the University of Mannheim. In 1967, Gaugler became rector (president) of the university and remained in this position until 1969. He was succeeded by Hans-Martin Pawlowski in his role as rector of the UMA. He left the university in 1969 and remained until his retirement in 1991 at LMU. Borchardt was author of the well-known "Borchardt-Hypothesis", which claims that stabilisation policy in Germany during the Great Depression was credit constrained and that lack of budgetary discipline during the preceding years was instrumental in creating this constraint. In 1987, he received the Gottfried Wilhelm Leibniz Prize and in 1999 the Bavarian Maximilian Order for Science and Art. Between 1968 and 1982, Borchardt was editor of the influential Jahrbücher für Nationalökonomie und Statistik.

== Death ==
Borchardt died on 5 February 2023, at the age of 93.

== Publications ==
- Die Industrielle Revolution in Deutschland. London 1969. ISBN 3-492-00340-0
- Wachstum, Krisen, Handlungsspielräume der Wirtschaftspolitik. Göttingen 1982. ISBN 3-5253-5708-7 (engl. 1991)
- Grundriss der deutschen Wirtschaftsgeschichte. Göttingen 1985. ISBN 3-5253-3421-4
- Wirtschaftspolitik in der Krise. Die (Geheim-)Konferenz der Friedrich List-Gesellschaft im September 1931 über Möglichkeiten und Folgen einer Kreditausweitung. (together with Hans Otto Schötz) Baden-Baden 1991. ISBN 3-7890-2116-4
- Max Webers Börsenschriften. Rätsel um ein übersehenes Werk. Munich 2000. ISBN 3-7696-1610-3
- Globalisierung in historischer Perspektive. Munich 2001. ISBN 3-7696-1614-6

== See also ==
- List of University of Mannheim people
- University of Mannheim
- Munich
- Bavaria
