= Mannheim School of Law and Economics =

School of the University of Mannheim

- Type: Public
- Established: 2004
- Dean: Georg Bitter
- Location: Mannheim, Baden-Württemberg, Germany
- Website: juravwl.uni-mannheim.de

The Mannheim School of Law and Economics (MSLE) is among the largest of the five schools of the University of Mannheim, located in Mannheim, Baden-Württemberg, Germany. It was established in 2004 and consists of the two major departments: law and economics.

== Department of Law ==
The Department of Law was founded in 1963 and maintains eighteen full professors, their staff and numerous renowned associate lecturers that research and teach. The Department of Law is home to several important institutes and programs e.g. the Institute for Company Law (Institut für Unternehmensrecht (IURUM)), the Institute for Insurance Law (Institut für Versicherungswissenschaft) or the Centre for Bankruptcy Law (Zentrum für Insolvenz und Sanierung (ZIS)).

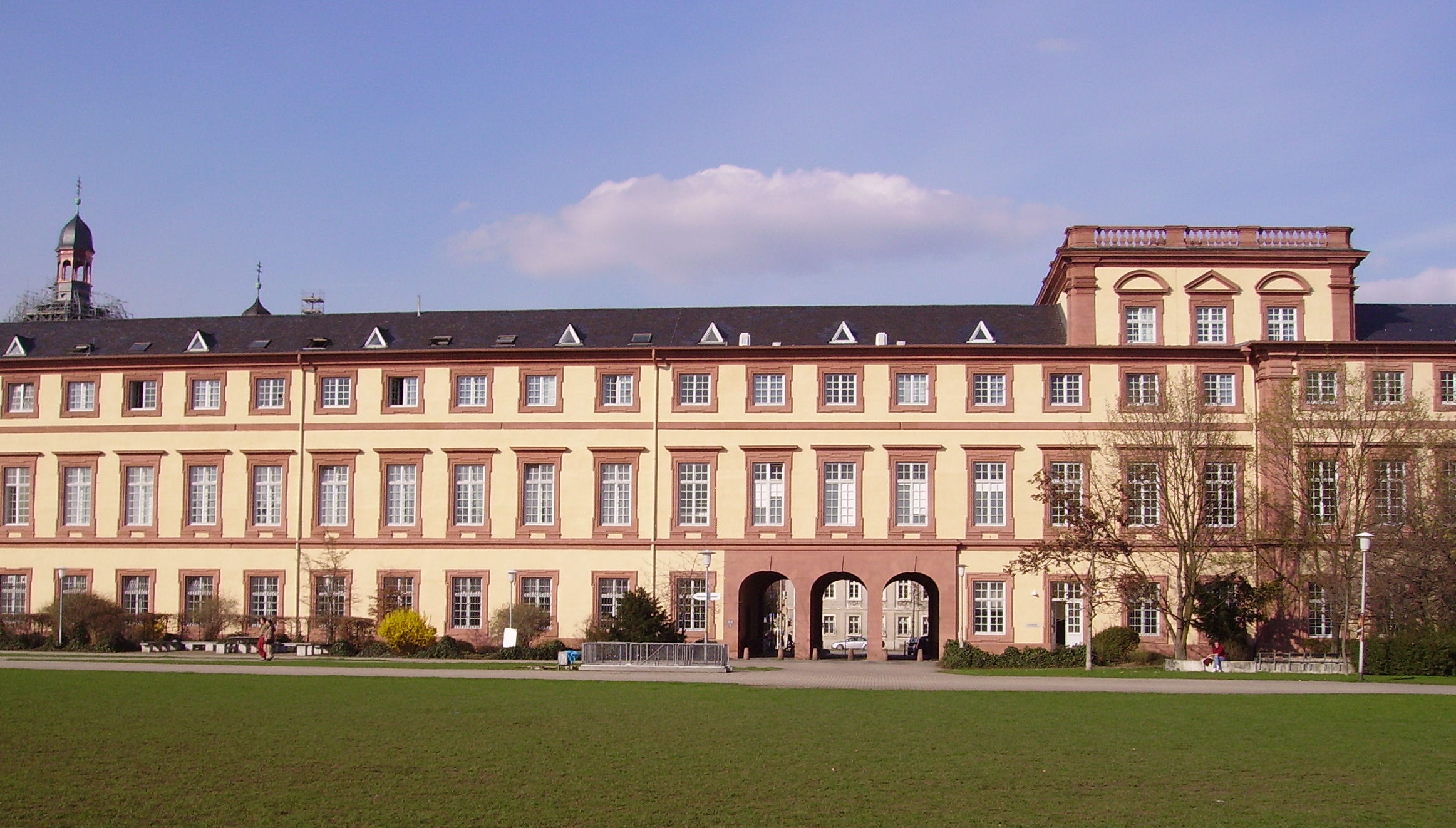
The Westflügel (West Wing) that is home to the Department of Law

The department of law places clear emphasis on the fields of commercial and business law. Close ties to legal and business practice, combined with an interdisciplinary profile in the economic sciences, are hallmarks of the Department of Law.

Mannheim's Law school is the first law school in Germany to introduce a modern Bachelor of Law study program, the so-called "Bachelor Unternehmensjurist", while maintaining the high standards of the legal State Examination system. The programme combines modules from the Department of Law (thematic priority on business law) and the Business School (thematic priority human resources or tax and accounting). It enables students to study law and business simultaneously and ends after 6 semesters (3 years) with a bachelor's degree. It is the first bachelor's degree in Germany which can be followed up with a master's (graduate) programme in business, a master's (graduate) programme of law or the German state examination in law (Staatsexamen) (German government licensing examination).

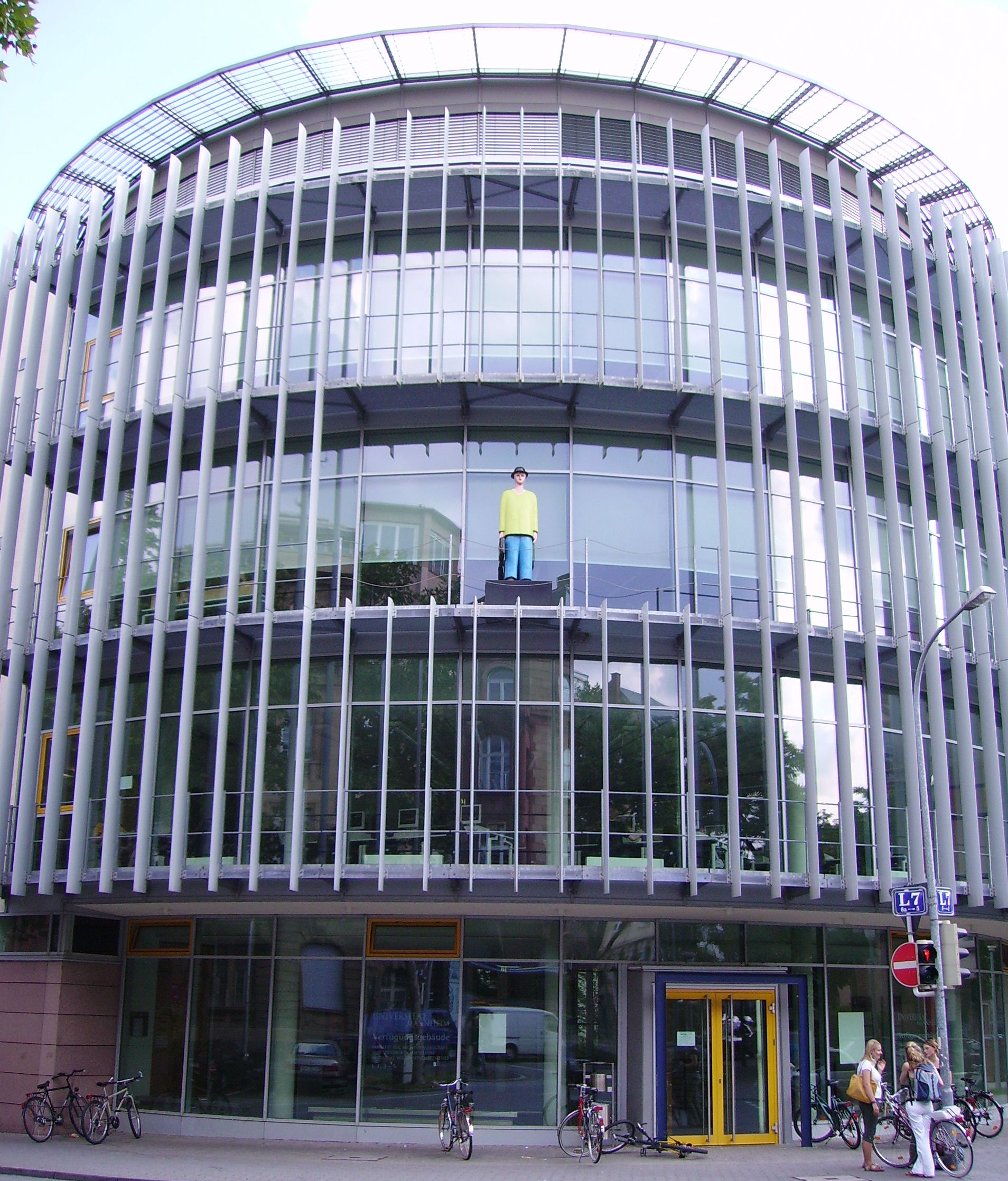
The L7 building that hosts the Department of Economics and the GESS Graduate School

== Department of Economics ==
The Department of Economics is among the oldest and most prestigious at the University of Mannheim. More than twenty full-time senior faculty members and 21 assistant professors and numerous lecturers are engaged in a variety of research projects at the frontiers of their fields, ranging from micro- and macroeconomics, econometrics, labour economics, industrial organization, financial economics, auctions and game theory, policy analysis and evaluation to economic history and international trade. The department has special expertise in microeconomic specializations and econometrics, both in theory and application. Its research programmes are aided by large institutional grants from the German National Science Foundation (DFG); additional funds are obtained from other public and private institutions. The department owns a library collection of more than 350,000 volumes in German as well as other languages (mostly English) and subscribes to 400 journals.

The Department of Economics of the University of Mannheim is ranked 1st in Germany and is ranked as the best and most research intensive department among all German-speaking countries. Furthermore, the 2013 Economics Ranking of Handelsblatt ranks 6 professors of Mannheim's department among the world's 100 most influential researchers in Economics. The department maintains close partnerships and exchange agreements with universities like Yale University, University of California, Berkeley or the Warwick University.

The 2010 Humboldt Professorship Prize winner Gerard J. van den Berg was tasked with setting up a Centre of Economics and Empirical Economics at the department.

== See also ==
- Education in Germany
- List of universities in Germany
