= International Business Education Alliance =

- Abbreviation: IBEA
- Formation: 2015
- Type: NGO
- Legal status: Active
- Headquarters: Mannheim, Baden-Württemberg, Germany
- Members: ESSEC, University of Mannheim, University of South Carolina, Fundação Getúlio Vargas
- Website: www.ibea-bachelor.org

The International Business Education Alliance (IBEA) is an exchange programme for undergraduate students in Business Administration. Besides studying at their home university, admitted undergraduate students participate in an extended bachelor's program that includes three exchange semesters at the participating institutions in the network. Participants are the University of Mannheim (Germany), ESSEC Business School (France), University of South Carolina, Darla Moore School of Business (United States), and the Fundação Getúlio Vargas (Brazil).

== History ==
IBEA was founded on August 1, 2015, when the deans of the respective business schools agreed to form the new partnership alliance IBEA.

== Description ==
The IBEA program aims to provide undergraduate business students with a comprehensive view of the global environment of business. It consists of a four-year Bachelor program that draws on the academic expertise of each participating partner school. Selected students study part of the program as one cohort and stay one semester at each of the four participating institutions. Each school offers customized classes and cultural courses designed for IBEA students. Besides a local and regional exposure, students gain hands-on global management experience by working closely with one corporate partner from each school. The first three semesters are completed at each student's individual home institution. Beginning with the fourth semester, the IBEA students study for the subsequent four semesters, starting at the University of Mannheim Business School, followed by the Darla Moore School of Business of the University of South Carolina and ESSEC's campus in Singapore. The last study abroad semester is spent at the Brazilian School of Public and Business Administration in Rio de Janeiro.
