= IfM – Small and Medium Sized Companies and Entrepreneurship =

German economic and research institute

- Abbreviation: IfM
- Formation: 1987
- Type: NGO, gGmbH
- Purpose: Research
- Location: Mannheim, Baden-Wuerttemberg, Germany
- Director: Michael Woywode
- Affiliations: University of Mannheim
- Staff: 30
- Website: ifm.uni-mannheim.de

The IfM – Small and Medium Sized Companies and Entrepreneurship (German: Institut für Mittelstandsforschung) in Mannheim, Germany is an economic and entrepreneurship research institute and associated with the University of Mannheim. Under the leadership of Prof. Dr. Michael Woywode, president of the institute, IfM employs a staff of about 30 researchers. The IfM was established in Mannheim in 1987 and is still headquartered there. The institute is organised as an NGO with a legal form of gGmbH.

== Organization and Research ==
The IfM Mannheim has defined four core research areas:

- Management Concepts and Information/Communication Technology
- Family businesses
- Contemporary Self-Responsibility
- Entrepreneurship
