= Otto H. Jacobs =

- Born: 12 October 1939 (age 86); Bracht, North Rhine-Westphalia, Germany
- Education: University of Cologne; Free University Berlin; RWTH Aachen University
- Scientific career
- Fields: Taxation, Tax Law, General Business Administration
- Workplaces: University of Mannheim, University of Münster, University of Regensburg

Otto H. Jacobs (born 1939 in Bracht, North Rhine-Westphalia, Germany) is a German researcher and former chairman of Ernst & Young. Previously he was professor for tax law/taxation at the University of Mannheim and University of Münster and served as President (rector) of the University of Mannheim between 1988 and 1994. Furthermore, Jacobs served as chairmen of the Mannheim Business School from 2005 to 2009, research associate at the ZEW, and member of the international advisory board of the ESSEC Business School in Paris.

== Education ==
He obtained his Ph.D. in business administration at the University of Regensburg in 1966, after having earned a bachelor's and master's degree in economics and business administration at the University of Cologne, Free University Berlin and RWTH Aachen University in 1964.

== Publications ==
- Effective Tax Burden in Europe - Current Situation, Past Developments and Simulations of Reforms (together with C. Spengel), Schriftenreihe des ZEW, Physica-Verlag, Heidelberg 2002
- Company Taxation in the New EU Member States - Survey of the Tax Regimes and Effective Tax Burdens for Multinational Investors. Study of ZEW and of Fa. Ernst & Young AG (together with C. Spengel, M. Finkenzeller and M. Roche), Frankfurt 2003, 2. Aufl. July 2004
- International Taxation of Expatriates - Survey of 20 Tax and Social Security Regimes and Analysis of Effective Tax Burdens on International Assignments. Study of PricewaterhouseCoopers and ZEW (together with D. Endres, Chr. Spengel, C. Elschner, R. Höfer, and O. Schmidt), Fachverlag Moderne Wirtschaft, Frankfurt/Main 2005
- Taxes in the Federal Republic of Germany - An Overview for Foreign Investors (English), Unternehmenssteuern in der Bundesrepublik Deutschland - Ein Überblick für Auslandsinvestoren (German). Conducted for the Federal Ministry of Economics and Energy by PriceWaterhouseCoopers GmbH and the University of Mannheim. Editor: D. Endres, M. Hug, O.H. Jacobs, C. Spengel, Berlin 1996; 2. Aufl. Berlin 2001

== See also ==
- List of University of Mannheim people
- RWTH Aachen University
