= Heinrich Chantraine =

German academic (1929–2002)

- Born: 10 February 1929; Betzdorf, Rhineland-Palatinate, Germany
- Died: 9 December 2002 (aged 73)
- Education: University of Mainz
- Scientific career
- Fields: History, Numismatics
- Institutions: University of Mannheim, University of Mainz

Heinrich Chantraine (10 February 1929 in Betzdorf, Rhineland-Palatinate, Germany – 9 December 2002 in Mossautal, Hesse) was a German researcher, numismatician and professor of history at the University of Mannheim as well as the University of Mainz. Furthermore, he served as president (rector) of the University of Mannheim between 1985 and 1988.

== Education ==
Chantraine obtained his PhD in history at the University of Mainz in 1952. His dissertation was supervised by Hans Ulrich Instinsky and dealt with the examination of the Roman history at the end of the 2nd century AD. Previously, he had obtained a master's degree in history and classical philology at the University of Mainz.

== Academics ==
After having completed his PhD, Chantraine worked from 1957 to 1958 on projects, supervised by Konrad Kraft, that were dealing with ancient Roman coins found in Germany and afterwards served as research associate at the University of Mainz. In 1965, Chantraine finished his habilitation with his work on "Slavery and Release in service for the Roman Emperor" (Freigelassene und Sklaven im Dienst der römischen Kaiser). Two years later he became chaired professor at the history department of the University of Mannheim (UMA). Between 1970 and 1970 he served as vice president of the university and from 1986 to 1988 president of the UMA. In 1995 Chantraine retired.

== Research ==
Chantraine's research focus was the late antiquity, the Roman social history and auxiliary science of history as well as numismatics and metrology. During his active time as professor he published a large number of diverse publications. Since 1988, he was a full member of the Mainzer Akademie der Wissenschaften (Academy of Sciences in Mainz) and member of supervisory board of the Ekkehardstiftung.
