= European Network for Training Economic Research =

European Network for Training in Economic Research
- Abbreviation: ENTER
- Formation: 1990
- Type: NGO
- Location: Mannheim, Baden-Württemberg, Germany
- Members: Universitat Autonoma de Barcelona; Université Libre de Bruxelles; Universidad Carlos III de Madrid; University of Mannheim; Stockholm University; Université Toulouse 1 Capitole; Tilburg University; University College London; Stockholm School of Economics
- Website: enter-network.org

The European Network for Training in Economic Research (ENTER) is an exchange programme for graduate students in Economics.

== Studying abroad ==
Besides studying at their home university, graduate students can do one or two exchange semesters at the participating Economic departments in the network. Among those are the leading European Economic departments.

== ENTER programme ==
The idea of the ENTER programme is to foster economic research and amplify the interaction between young researchers and supervisors from different institutions. Additionally, to the supervision by professors of their home university, ENTER participants profit from interchanging with researchers of the host university as well. Thus, they access a much larger body of fellows.

The ENTER network allows its Ph.D. students to join a partner institution and follow either the coursework of the first year or the thesis-writing phase. In order to obtain an ENTER degree, the student has to join the partner institution for at least one term. Moreover, the network allows master students to obtain a double degree. The ENTER Research Master programmes in Brussels, Madrid, Mannheim, Stockholm and Toulouse are two-year programme (120 ECTS credits) that rely on a common set of core courses in the first year and optional courses in the second year. In the second year, the student specializes in field courses and writes his master thesis. All courses are given in English. Participation is based on academic excellence and requires applying at the individual faculty.

Yearly held meetings called "Jamborees" focus on the presentation of current topics in Economics by ENTER participants. Furthermore, they should foster the links between junior and senior researchers of the same field. The ENTER Jamboree 2011 took place in Tilburg and 2010 in Touluse.

From March 1, 2011 Richard Blundell (UCL, London), Torsten Persson (Stockholm University) and Jean Tirole (Université de Toulouse I) agreed to form the new scientific committee at ENTER. The first president was Jean Tirole with Maurizio Zanardi as Director. Torsten Persson served as the second president for two years from 1 March 2013. Previous president Jean Tirole as well as Richard Blundell continued as the member of Scientific Committee.

== Participants ==
Participants are Universitat Autonoma de Barcelona (Spain), Université libre de Bruxelles (Belgium), Universidad Carlos III de Madrid (Spain), Stockholm University (Sweden), Université Toulouse 1 Capitole (France), University of Mannheim (Germany), University College London (United Kingdom), Tilburg University (Netherlands) and Stockholm School of Economics. (Sweden)
