= Mannheim Centre for Competition and Innovation =

German research association

MaCCI – Mannheim Zentrum für Wettbewerb und Innovation
- Abbreviation: MaCCI
- Formation: 2008
- Type: NGO
- Purpose: Research
- Location: Mannheim, Baden-Wuerttemberg, Germany
- Region served: Europe, Germany
- Directors: Jens-Uwe Franck; Bernhard Ganglmair; Martin Peitz; Nicolas Schutz; Achim Wambach
- Affiliations: ZEW; University of Mannheim
- Website: macci-mannheim.eu

The Mannheim Centre for Competition and Innovation (MaCCI) in Mannheim, Germany is a research association of ZEW and the Faculty of Law and Economics at the University of Mannheim. The aim of MaCCI is to foster interdisciplinary research in the area of competition, regulation and innovation policy. MaCCI research contributes to fundamental problems in economics and law as they apply to competition, economics of innovation, and regulation. Core research topics include digital markets and platform economics, competitive effects of mergers and acquisitions, consumer search, public and private enforcement of competition law and innovation. About 70 researchers are members of MaCCI. Each year, MaCCI (co-)organizes a number of conferences and workshops for both young and experienced researchers to strengthen the exchange between researchers in the fields of law and economics. Detailed information on MaCCI activities and events can be found on the MaCCI website and the annual Activity Reports and MaCCI Letters, which contain three research highlights by MaCCI members each year.

== MaCCI Advisory Board Members ==
The MaCCI Advisory Board consists of:

- Cristina Caffarra (Keystone Strategy)
- Silke Hossenfelder (Bundeskartellamt)
- Bruno Jullien (Toulouse School of Economics)
- William E. Kovacic (George Washington University)
- Massimo Motta (ICREA-Universitat Pompeu Fabra and Barcelona Graduate School of Economics)
- Heike Schweitzer (Humboldt University Berlin)
- Fiona Scott Morton (Yale University)
- Daniela Seeliger (Linklaters)
- Alexandre de Streel (University of Namur)

== MaCCI on Social Media ==
- MaCCI on Twitter
- MaCCI on YouTube

== Associated Institutions and Networks ==
- The Centre on Regulation in Europe (CERRE)
- The Competition and Regulation European Summer School (CRESSE)
- The Competition Law and Economics European Network (CLEEN)
