= Otto Beck =

German politician

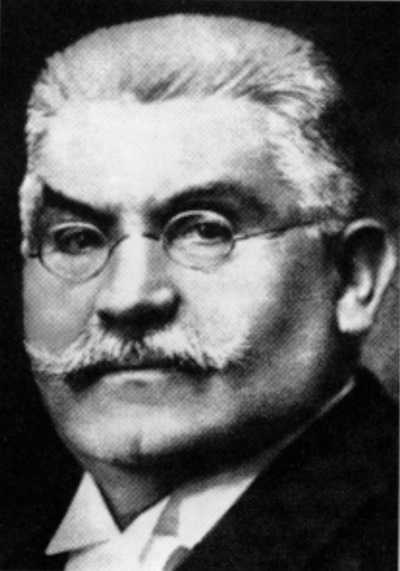
- Born: 19 May 1846; Krautheim, Baden-Württemberg, Germany
- Died: 30 March 1908 (aged 61)
- Education: Heidelberg University

Otto Beck (30 March 1846 – 19 May 1908) was a German politician, and former senior mayor for Mannheim from 1891 to 1908. Moreover, by having founded the Handelshochschule Mannheim together with Heinrich Gothein in 1907, he is regarded as one of the founding fathers of the University of Mannheim.

== Education ==
Beck was born in Krautheim, Baden-Württemberg, Germany. He studied law at the Heidelberg University until 1871, where he obtained his Staatsexamen (equivalent to Juris Doctor). Later in his life, Beck received an Honorary doctor from his alma mater.

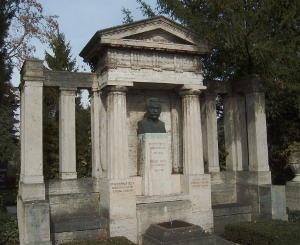
Otto Beck monument in Mannheim

== Live ==
Later, Beck, together with Heidelberg's economics professor Eberhard Gothein (1853–1923), initiated the foundation of the Handelshochschule Mannheim to revive academic education in Mannheim.

== Literature ==
- Gustaf Jacob (1953). "Beck, Otto". Neue Deutsche Biographie (in German). Vol. 1. Berlin: Duncker & Humblot. pp. 707–707. (full text online).
- Engelbert Strobel: Oberbürgermeister Otto Julius Beck. In: Badische Heimat 1982, Heft 2. Karlsruhe 1982
- Stadt Mannheim, Michael Caroli, Ulrich Nieß (Hg.): Geschichte der Stadt Mannheim: Bd 2 1801–1914. Ubstadt-Weiher 2007, ISBN 978-3-89735-471-5

== See also ==
- Mannheim
- List of University of Mannheim people
- University of Mannheim
- Heidelberg University
