= Otto-Selz-Institute of Applied Psychology =

German research institute

Coordinates: 49.4809°N 8.4690°E

- Abbreviation: OSI
- Formation: 1964
- Location: Mannheim, Baden-Wuerttemberg, Germany
- Director: Prof. Dr. Georg W. Alpers, Dipl.-Psych. (2011-)
- Affiliations: University of Mannheim
- Website: osi.uni-mannheim.de

The Otto-Selz-Institute (OSI) (in German: Otto-Selz-Institut für Angewandte Psychologie) is an interdisciplinary research institute at the University of Mannheim. It combines research, teaching and therapy.

== History ==
The institute is named after the German psychologist Otto Selz (1881 - 1943). As a professor of philosophy, psychology and education, he devoted himself equally to questions of theoretical and applied psychology as well as questions of philosophy and education. In particular, he published on the psychology of thinking. In 1929 he took up the position of rector of the Mannheim Commercial College (later the University of Mannheim), which he had to resign in the wake of National Socialism in 1930 because of his Jewish origins.

== Concept ==
The Otto Selz Institute comprises teaching, research and therapy. This includes the psychological outpatient clinic of the University of Mannheim, the training outpatient clinic for prospective psychotherapists, as well as the research area, which is closely linked to the Chair of Clinical and Biological Psychology and Psychotherapy at the university. The aim is to offer patients psychotherapy in accordance with the latest research and to train future psychotherapists. The facility is in close interdisciplinary exchange with other regional institutions on new scientific findings.

== Therapy ==
The therapy services are provided by psychotherapists and psychotherapists in postgraduate training, who are supervised by licensed psychotherapists and psychotherapists. The institute offers psychological psychotherapy as well as child and adolescent psychotherapy. This involves clinical-psychological diagnostics with subsequent psychotherapeutic treatment according to the cognitive behavioral therapy method and in accordance with the guidelines of the Association of Statutory Health Insurance Physicians.

== Teaching / Training ==
Together with the Central Institute for Mental Health (Zentralinstitut für Seelische Gesundheit, ZI), the Otto Selz Institute forms the Mannheim Center for Psychological Psychotherapy (Zentrum für Psychologische Psychotherapie, ZPP). Training opportunities include postgraduate training in psychological psychotherapy and child and adolescent psychotherapy. In addition, further training in clinical neuropsychology is offered in cooperation with the Südwestakademie für Neuropsychologie. The Otto Selz Institute cooperates closely in teaching with the Chair of Clinical and Biological Psychology and Psychotherapy at the University of Mannheim and with the Psychological Institute Conference Baden-Württemberg (PsIKo BaWü).

== Research ==
The research projects of the Otto Selz Institute are both fundamental (laboratory experimental psychopathology) and application-oriented (psychotherapy research). The focus is on a holistic concept of research and theory and its implementation. The focus is on linking neuroscientific and social science methodology and their investigation at various process levels (e.g. self-reports, behavior and physiological processes).

== See also ==
- Mannheim
- University of Mannheim
