= Palais Bretzenheim =

Historical building in Mannheim, Baden-Württemberg, Germany

Coordinates: 49°28′58.8″N 8°27′43.2″E

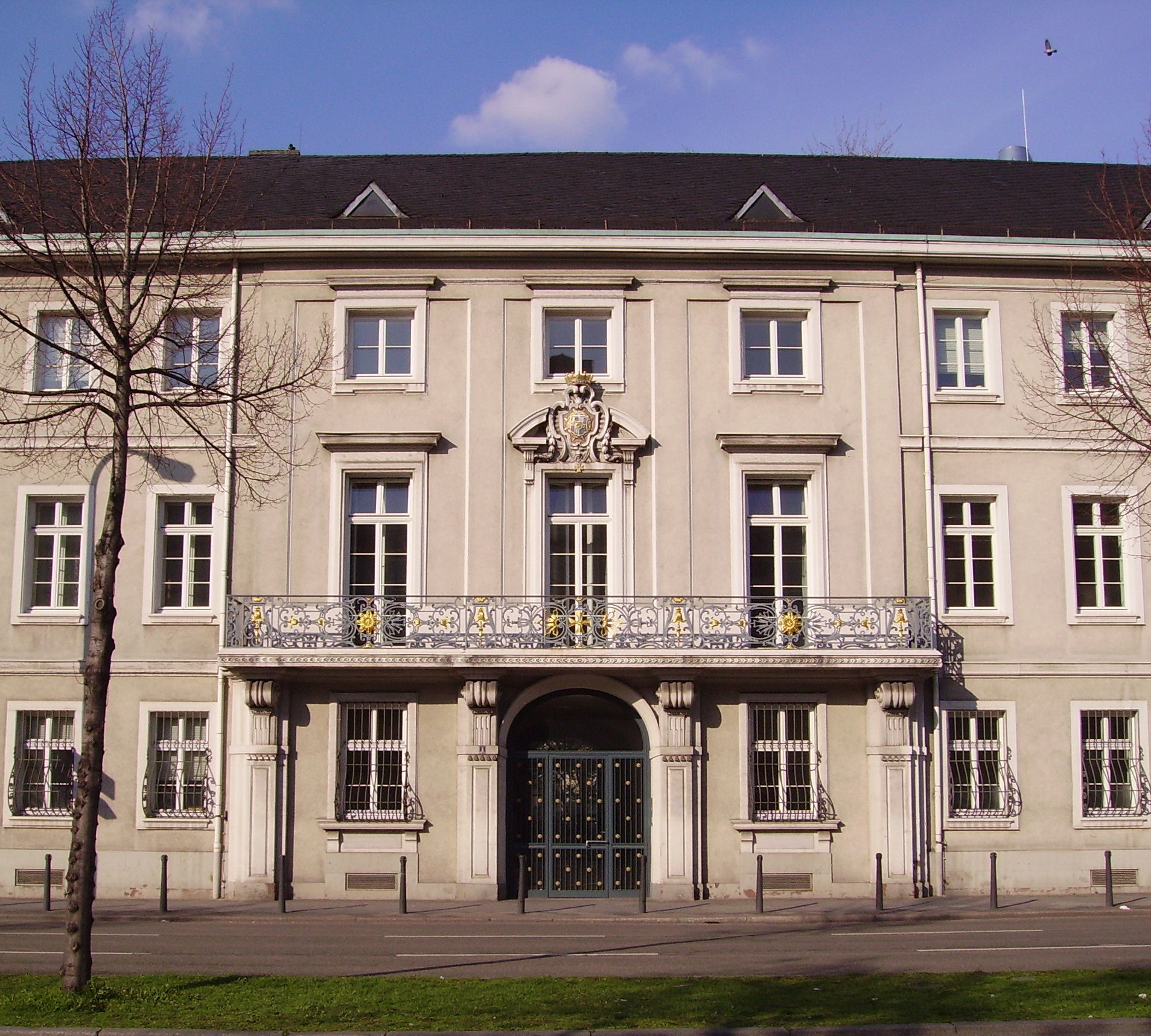
Mannheim Palais Bretzenheim today

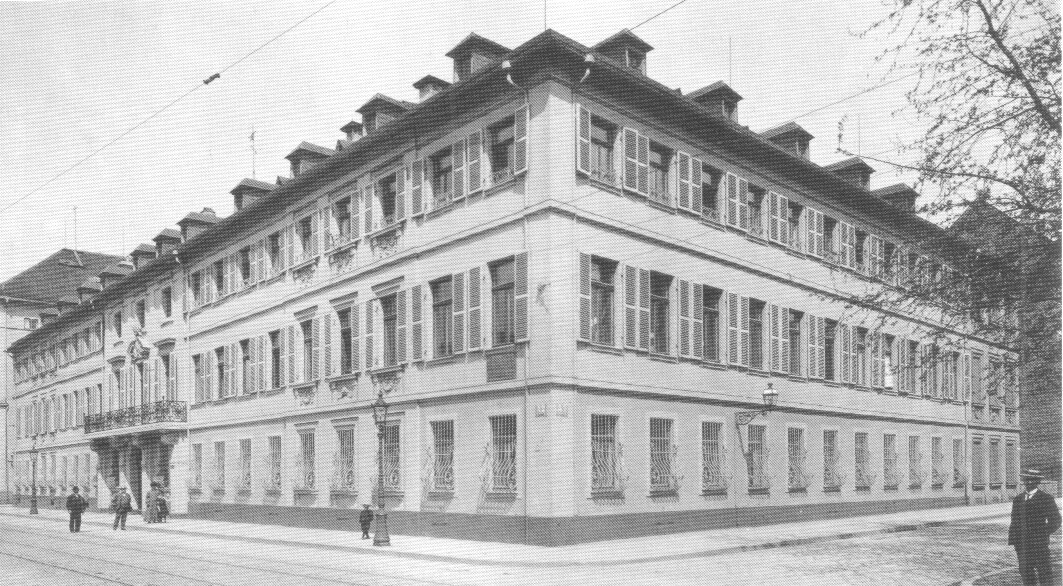
Mannheim Palais Bretzenheim in 1914

The Palais Bretzenheim (Bretzenheim Palace) is a historical building located in Mannheim, Baden-Württemberg in the South Western part of Germany. It is located near the Mannheim Palace on the University of Mannheim's campus. The Palais was built between 1781 and 1788 according to the plans of the court architect Peter Anton von Verschaffelt and belongs to the most important historical buildings of Mannheim's nobility. Originally, the Palais hosted the four children of Charles Theodore, Elector of Bavaria and his mistress Josepha Seyffert as well as accommodated Wolfgang Amadeus Mozart for a limited time teaching the elector's children how to play the piano. Today, the Palais houses parts of the district court Mannheim.

== Architecture ==
The building covers the whole southern part of the square (Quadrat) A2. The large frontside opposing the Mannheim Palace has 21 windows and three floors. The three middle arbors are bulged and incorporate a continuous balcony. The center window carries the official seal of the Family Heydeck-Bretzenheim.

== Rooms ==
The Palais has about 60 rooms and was structured in 1970:

The ground floor of the right wing hosted the Bretzenheim administration and offered living and working rooms for the chancellor's director and several rooms for assistants and other administrative staff.

== See also ==
- Mannheim Palace
- Electoral Palatinate

== Literature ==
- Friedrich Walter: Bauwerke der Kurfürstenzeit in Mannheim, Mannheim 1928
