= Hans-Martin Pawlowski =

- Born: 30 October 1931; Bochum, North Rhine-Westphalia, Germany
- Died: 14 March 2016 (aged 84); Düsseldorf, Germany
- Education: Ludwig-Maximilians-Universität München, University of Göttingen, University of Freiburg, University of Münster
- Scientific career
- Fields: Civil law
- Workplaces: University of Mannheim

Hans-Martin Pawlowski (30 October 1931 – 14 March 2016) was a German researcher, lawyer and former professor for civil law at the University of Mannheim from 1966 to 1994. Moreover, he served as president at the University of Mannheim between 1969 and 1970.

== Education ==
Pawlowski studied from 1951 to 1959 law at the Ludwig-Maximilians-Universität München, the University of Freiburg and the University of Münster where he obtained his first and second Staatsexamen (comparable to an LL.B and an LL.M). He received his doctorate at the University of Göttingen in 1960 and habilitated in civil law in 1964 researching the Rechtsgeschäftliche Folgen nichtiger Willenserklärungen. Amts- und Parteinichtigkeit von Rechtsgeschäften - Zum Verhältnis von Privatautonomie und objektiven Recht (The law effects of void intentions).

== Academics ==
Pawlowski worked from 1966 to 1994 as chaired professor at the University of Mannheim where he was researching issues related to civil and civil process law. In 1969, he became rector (president) of the university and remained in this position until 1970. He was succeeded by Gerhard Zeitel in his role as rector. From 1973 to 1990, he was member of the Mannheim School of Social Sciences and between 1987 and 1994 member of the research position for societal development (Forschungsstelle für gesellschaftliche Entwicklung (FGE)) at the University of Mannheim.

== Publications ==
- Pawlowski, Hans-Martin. Der Rechtsbesitz im geltenden Sachen- und Immaterialgüterrecht, Verlag Otto Schwarz & Co., Göttingen 1961
- Pawlowski, Hans-Martin. Methodenlehre für Juristen. Theorie der Norm und des Gesetzes. 3. überarbeitete und erweiterte Aufl., C. F. Müller Juristischer Verlag, Heidelberg 1999, ISBN 3-8114-6790-5.
- Pawlowski, Hans-Martin. Einführung in die juristische Methodenlehre: ein Studienbuch zu den Grundlagenfächern Rechtsphilosophie und Rechtssoziologie. - 2., neubearb. Aufl.. - C. F. Müller, Heidelberg 2000. - (Jurathek: Studium), ISBN 3-8114-2243-X.
- Pawlowski, Hans-Martin. Allgemeiner Teil des BGB. Grundlehren des bürgerlichen Rechts. 7. neubearbeitete Aufl., Heidelberg 2003, C. F. Müller Verlag, ISBN 3-8114-1851-3

== See also ==
- List of University of Mannheim people
- University of Mannheim
- Bochum
- North Rhine-Westphalia
