= Mannheim School of Computer Science and Mathematics =

University in Mannheim, Germany

- Type: Public
- Established: 1967
- Dean: Bernd Lübcke
- Academic staff: 22 Chairs with 33 professors
- Location: Mannheim, Baden-Württemberg, Germany
- Website: https://www.wim.uni-mannheim.de/en/

The Mannheim School of Computer Science and Mathematics (MSCM) is among the younger of the five schools comprising the University of Mannheim, located in Mannheim, Baden-Württemberg, Germany. The School of Computer Science and Mathematics, established in 1967, covers the fields of Computer Science, Business Informatics and Mathematics. The Department of Computer Science at the University of Mannheim is considered as a leading public institution for computer science/business informatics in Germany. It has been consistently ranked among the top computer science programs in recent years. In the past 15 years, researchers from University of Mannheim Department of Computer Science have made developments in the fields of algorithms, computer networks, distributed systems, parallel processing, programming languages, robotics, language technologies, human-computer interaction and software engineering.

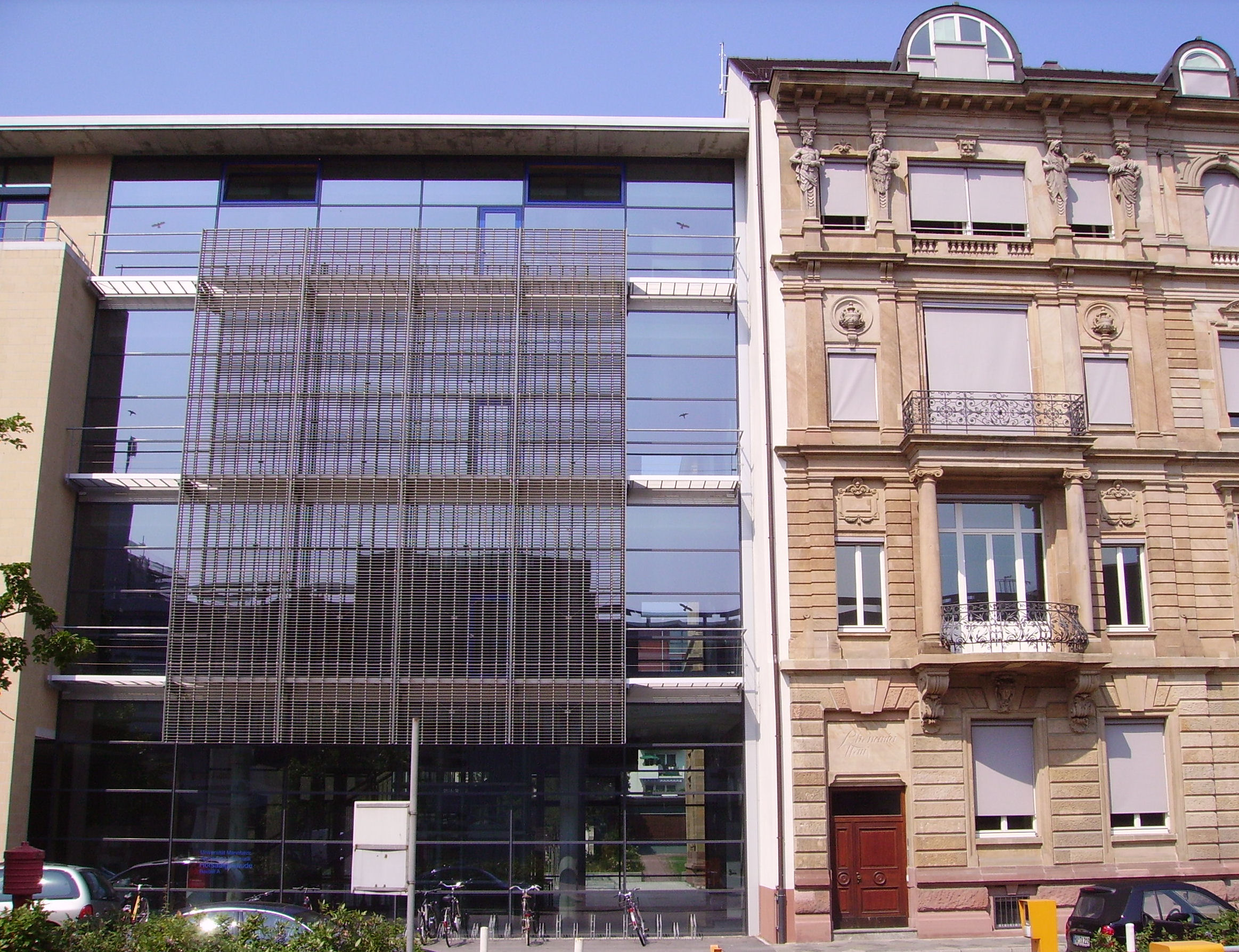
Department of Business Informatics and Mathematics

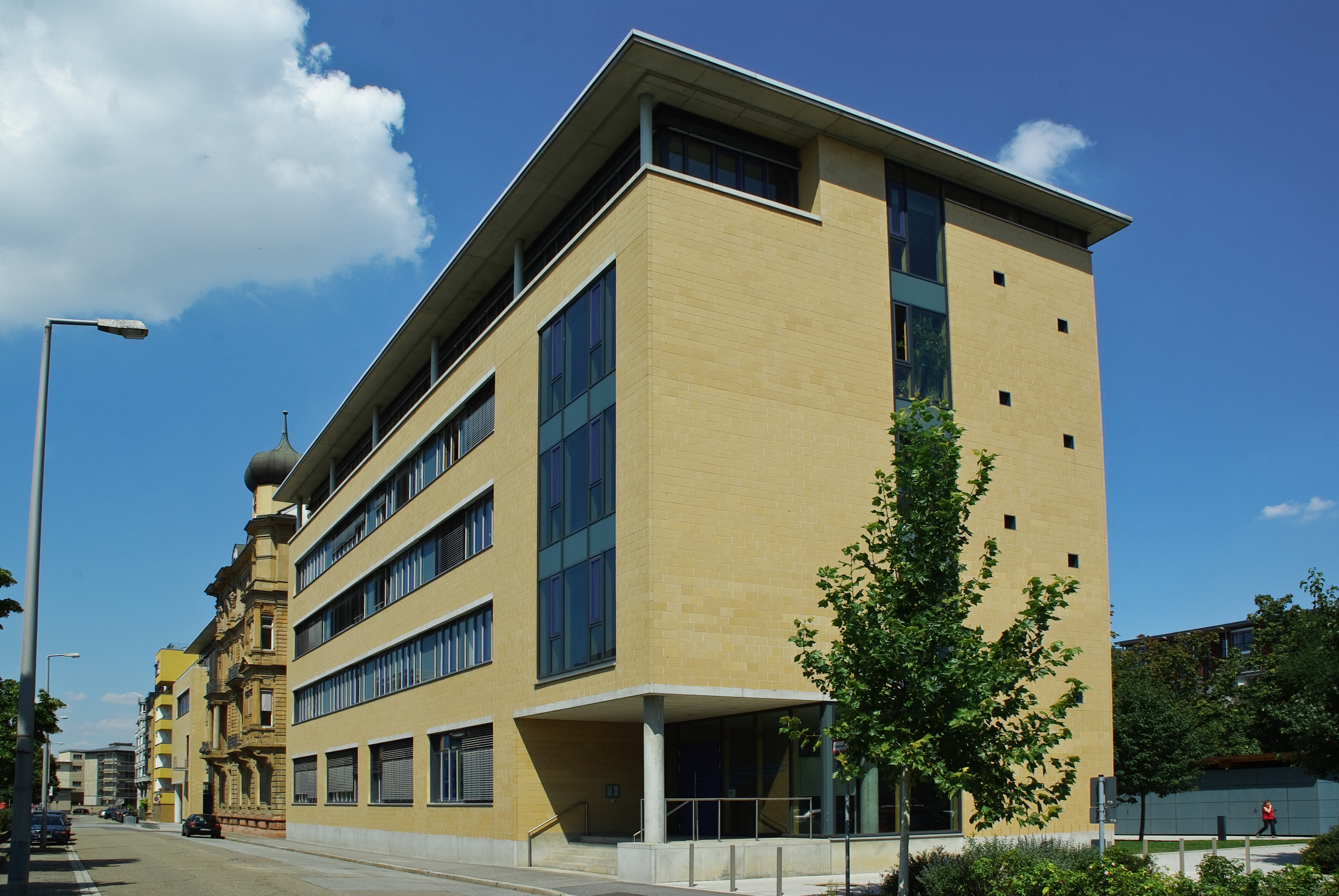
B6 building at Mannheim's campus that hosts chairs of the Computer Science and Mathematics departments

== Department of Computer Science ==
The Institute of Computer Science and Business Informatics consists of eleven Chairs and Professorships dedicated to Data Management, Software Development, Dependable Distributed Systems, Web Technologies, Cryptography, Process Modelling, Artificial Intelligence and Mobile and Visual Media. Their common point of interest is the management of complex data material for society and economy. The institute is mainly located in the building A 5,6. Together with the business informatics group that are part of the Business School, the Institute of Computer Science recently founded the Center for Business Informatics to ensure that research and teaching standards in this area remain at the highest level. The department has exchange agreements with renowned universities like the Carnegie Mellon University in the United States, the Seoul National University in South Korea or the National University of Singapore and maintains a highly international student body with more than 27% of students coming from abroad.

== Department of Mathematics ==
The Institute of Mathematics consists of eleven Chairs and 22 Professorships that focus on classical mathematical disciplines as well as on economic and practical-oriented fields of mathematics. The main areas of research include Algebra, Analysis, Geometry, Stochastics and Mathematical Statistics as well as Mathematics in Finance and Insurance. Through its successful focus on business mathematics in research and teaching, the Institute of Mathematics is constantly expanding its close cooperation with the University's Department of Economics and the Business School.

== See also ==
- University of Mannheim
- Mannheim Business School
- Education in Germany
- List of universities in Germany
