= Graduate School of Economic and Social Sciences =

Doctoral school in Germany

Graduate School of Economic and Social Sciences (GESS)
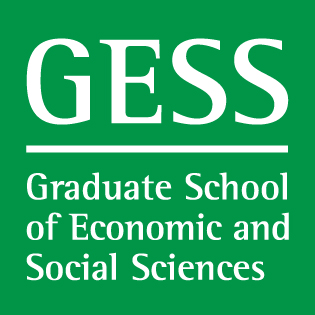
- Type: Graduate School
- Established: 2007
- Affiliations: University of Mannheim, German Universities Excellence Initiative, DAAD
- Dean: Prof. Dr. Edgar Erdfelder
- Academic staff: 194
- Postgraduates: 400
- Location: Mannheim, Baden-Württemberg, Germany; 49°29′00″N 8°27′53″E
- Campus: Urban
- Colors: Green, White
- Website: www.gess.uni-mannheim.de

The Graduate School of Economic and Social Sciences was founded in 2007 as a part of the University of Mannheim, which soon established itself as a leading doctoral school in Germany. It is housed in a Baroque Palace in Mannheim, in the state of Baden-Württemberg, Germany. The school offers graduate students the opportunity to pursue coursework and research in an array of fully funded graduate programs in 11 different disciplines of business, economic and social sciences.

The program offers dual layered training: First, the development of a common background through structured training in empirical and quantitative methods across a wide range of fields. Second, a more personalized mentoring in line with the chosen specialization by experienced supervisors.

It is funded by the German Universities Excellence Initiative, an initiative by the German federal and state governments to promote top-level research in Germany.

== Academics ==
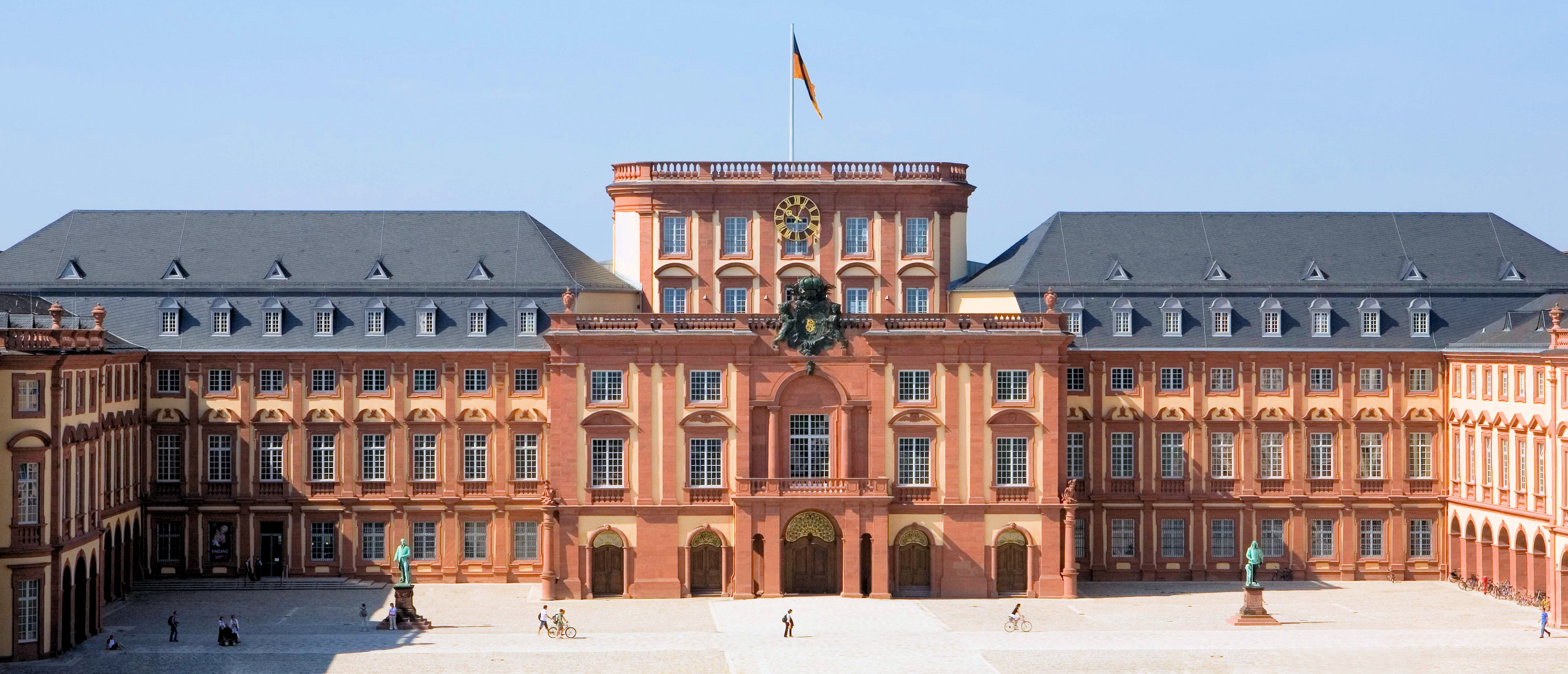
Graduate School of Economic and Social Sciences, University of Mannheim

The GESS integrates the disciplines of business administration, economics and the social sciences into a coherent curriculum. It comprises:

- The Center for Doctoral Studies in Business (CDSB), which offers PhD programs in Accounting, Finance, Information Systems, Management, Marketing, Operations Management and Taxation
- The Center for Doctoral Studies in Economics (CDSE), which offers a PhD program in Economics
- The Center for Doctoral Studies in Social and Behavioral Sciences (CDSS), which offers PhD programs in Psychology, Political Science, and Sociology
