= University of Mannheim =

Public university in Mannheim, Baden-Württemberg, Germany

- Universität Mannheim
- Motto: In omnibus veritas suprema lex esto (Latin)
- Motto in English: Truth in everything should be the supreme law
- Type: Public
- Established: 1 August 1967; 59 years ago
- Affiliations: AACSB; AMBA; CFA Institute; Council on Business & Society; DFG; EQUIS; ENTER; German Universities Excellence Initiative; IAU; IBEA
- Budget: €123 million
- Chancellor: Katrin Schoppa-Bauer
- Rector: Thomas Fetzer
- Academic staff: 907 (full time)
- Administrative staff: 617 (full time)
- Students: 12,000 (HWS 2020/21)
- Undergraduates: 7,173
- Postgraduates: 4,828
- Doctoral students: 793
- Location: Mannheim, Baden-Württemberg, Germany; 49°29′00″N 8°27′53″E
- Campus: Urban (Mannheim Palace), 74 acres (0.3 km^{2})
Colors
Mannheim Blue and White
- Website: www.uni-mannheim.de

- Location within Germany Location within Baden-Württemberg

The University of Mannheim (German: Universität Mannheim), abbreviated UMA, is a public research university in Mannheim, Baden-Württemberg, Germany. Founded in 1967, the university has its origins in the Palatine Academy of Sciences, which was established by Elector Carl Theodor at Mannheim Palace in 1763, as well as the Handelshochschule (Commercial College Mannheim), which was founded in 1907.

Today, the University of Mannheim is regarded as one of the most prestigious institutions of higher education in Germany and Continental Europe, particularly in the fields of economics, social sciences, law, and political science.

The university's main campus is located within Mannheim Palace, one of the largest Baroque palaces in Europe, which now houses both administrative offices and academic departments. The university offers undergraduate, graduate and doctoral programs in business administration, economics, law, social sciences, humanities, mathematics, computer science and information systems. In the academic year 2020/2021 the university had 11,640 full-time students, 1600 academic staff, with 194 professors, and a total income of around €121 million. It is organized into five schools and two graduate colleges.

Numerous former students and faculty members have held prominent positions in the German and international economic and institutional landscape. Notable alumni and affiliates include Isabel Schnabel, member of the Executive Board of the European Central Bank; Jens Weidmann, former president of the Deutsche Bundesbank; Clemens Fuest and Hans-Werner Sinn, current and former presidents of the ifo Institute; and Wolfgang Franz, chairman of the German Council of Economic Experts.

== History ==
The University of Mannheim has no clear foundation date. Its history can be traced back to the establishment of one of its predecessor institutions – the Kurpfälzische Akademie der Wissenschaften (Palatine Academy of Sciences) in Mannheim Palace, founded by Elector Carl Theodor in 1763. A further predecessor was the Municipal Commercial College Mannheim (1907–1933) which was reopened in 1946 as the State College for Economics Mannheim and renamed as to the University of Mannheim in 1967.

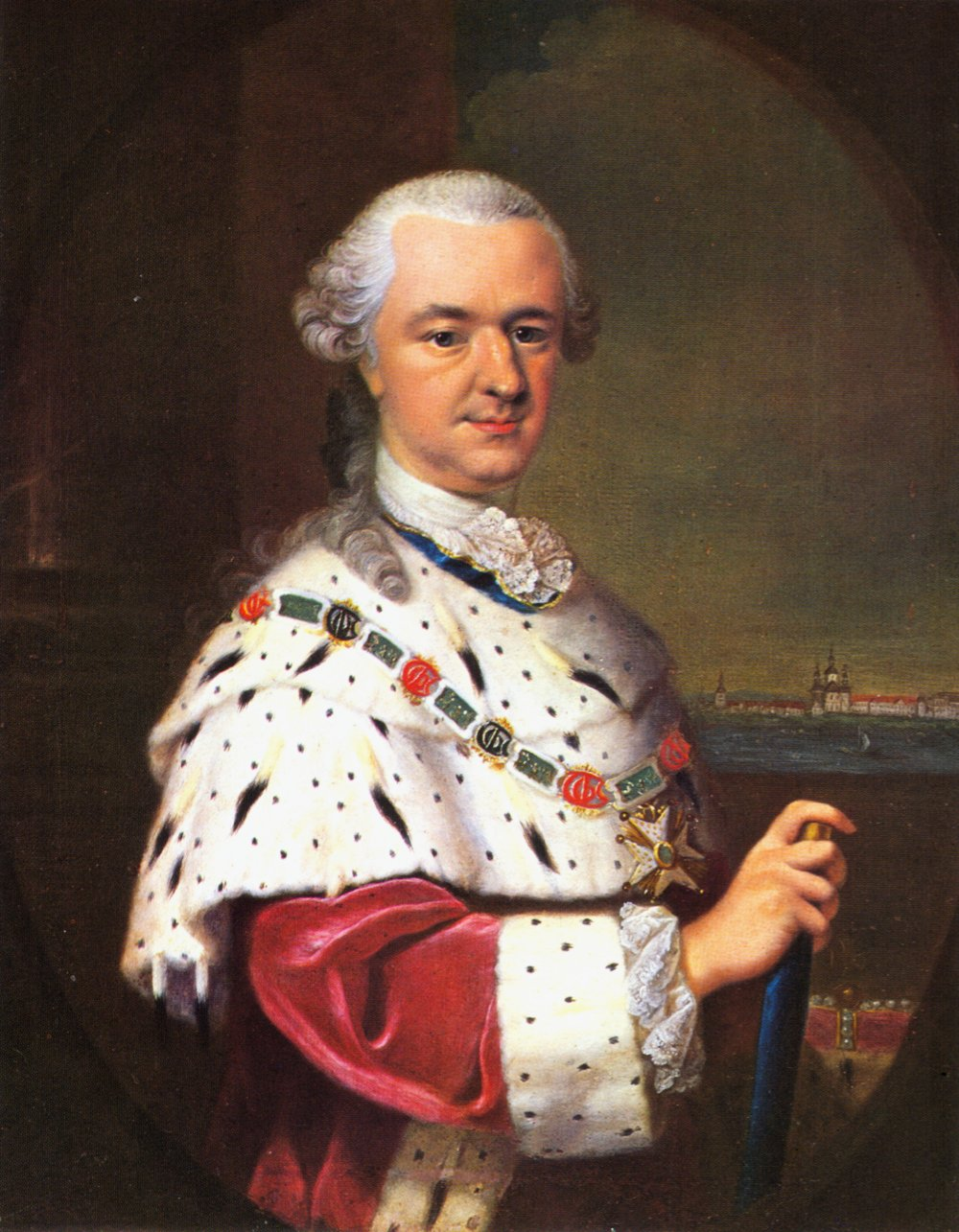
Charles Theodore, Elector of Bavaria, founder of the Palatine Academy of Sciences

=== 20th century ===
==== Municipal Commercial College Mannheim (1907–1933) ====
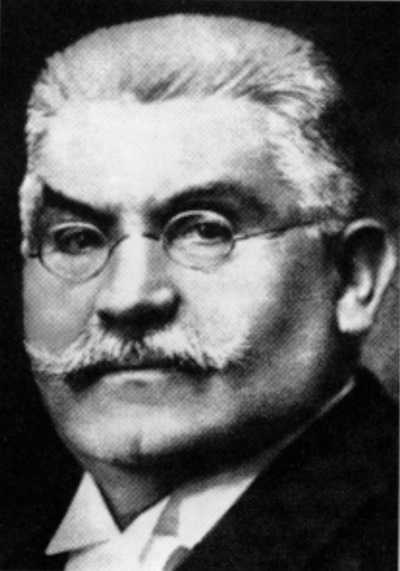
Otto Beck, one of the Founding Fathers of the Handelshochschule Mannheim

In 1907, the Städtische Handelshochschule Mannheim (Municipal Commercial College) was founded on the initiative of Mannheim's senior mayor Otto Beck (1846–1908) and the economics professor Eberhard Gothein (1853–1923) as a college for future merchants. It conducted teaching and research in business administration, economics, pedagogy, psychology, law, languages and the humanities. From the beginning, women had a strong standing at the Handelshochschule. In 1908, it was the first college of higher education in Germany to employ a female professor and one quarter of all students were female.

==== Under the Nazi regime (1933-1945) ====
In 1933, the Handelshochschule was merged into the University of Heidelberg by the Nazi municipal administration. Otto Selz, a German philosopher and psychologist with a Jewish background, who had been a professor at the Handelshochschule since 1923 and its rector in 1929/30, was discharged on 6 April 1933. This followed the Badischen Judenerlass administered by NSDAP politician Robert Heinrich Wagner, a decree designed to ban Jewish academics from German universities. In 1943, Selz was executed in Auschwitz concentration camp; with only 3 of the 14 Jewish docents at Mannheim's Handelshochschule surviving the Holocaust. With the transfer of all institutes, inventory and staff to Heidelberg University the merging process was completed, the "Jews released" and the Handelshochschule closed.

==== State College for Economics Mannheim (1946–1967) ====
From December 1940 until the end of World War II, Mannheim was heavily bombed and saw more than 150 air raids. The largest raid on Mannheim took place on 5–6 September 1943 when a major part of the city was destroyed. In 1944, the Mannheim Palace was almost entirely destroyed, leaving only one room undamaged out of over 500 and with only external walls surviving. By May 1945, only around 30 percent of the building stock in the city remained.

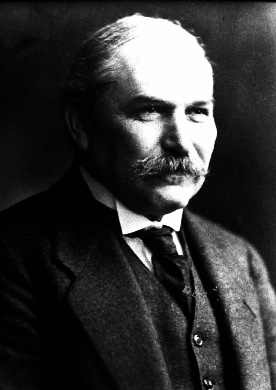
Eberhard Gothein, one of the Founders Fathers of the Handelshochschule Mannheim

In 1946, the Handelshochschule was reopened under its new name Staatliche Wirtschaftshochschule Mannheim (State College for Economics) with a student body of 586 students in the first year. In 1955, the Wirtschafshochschule moved into the rebuilt East Wing of Mannheim Palace. In the same year, the seal, which is still in use today, was created. It depicts the Mannheim Palace on top and the square-based outlay of Mannheim's downtown below; surrounded by the latin phrase "In Omnibus Veritas". This is a shortened version of the university's official motto, based on a line in the constitution of Carl Theodor's Palatine Academy of Sciences: In Omnibus Veritas Suprema Lex Esto, translated as "Truth in everything should be the supreme law".

==== University of Mannheim (1967) ====
In 1963, the Wirtschaftshochschule extended its faculties to a total of three – Business Administration and Social Sciences, Philosophy-Philological Sciences and Law. It subsequently gained the status of university on 4 July 1967. The University of Mannheim started out with around 3,000 registered students. During the growth phase of the university in the 1960s and 1970s the number of students and faculties increased. In 1969, the University of Mannheim expanded its faculty number to eight by adding the faculties of Economics, Geography and Political Sciences and by splitting the faculties of Business Administration and Social Sciences as well as Philosophy-Philological Sciences.

=== 21st century ===
The emphasis of the University of Mannheim has remained on business and economics, although teaching has been broadened to further disciplines. In 2000, its Business School received accreditation from the Association to Advance Collegiate Schools of Business.

In 2008, the rectorate passed a reform to strengthen the core disciplines of the University of Mannheim, that is the economic and social sciences. This transformation, which started in 2002 with the closure of certain departments and the fusion of formerly independent faculties, did not go without protests. In September 2006, around 1,000 students and professors demonstrated against the plans. Two years later, a compromise was found and the reform passed the Senate as well as the University Council without votes against. In the wake of the vote, the number of schools decreased to five.

In 2005, the Mannheim Business School (MBS) was founded. It offers MBA programmes for executive education. In 2018, it was ranked #1 in Germany in the international MBA Rankings by Businessweek, Financial Times, Forbes and The Economist. According to these rankings, the MBS also belongs to the Top 20 business schools in Europe and Top 60 in the world.

From 2007 until 2017, the University of Mannheim was funded by the "Excellence Initiative" of the Federal Ministry of Education and Research and the German Research Foundation. Under this initiative, the University of Mannheim established the Graduate School of Economic and Social Sciences (GESS) which offers Ph.D. programmes with a focus on empirical and quantitative methods and their interdisciplinary application in the economic and social sciences.

== Campus ==
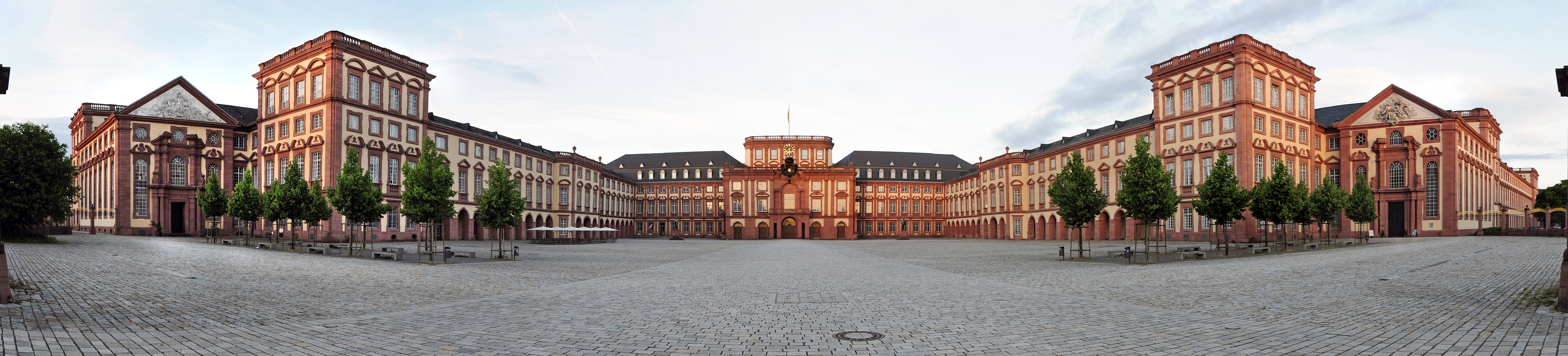
The heart of the University of Mannheim's campus – the Palace in a 180 degrees panoramic view

The University of Mannheim is located in the city center of Mannheim. It consists of Campus East, reaching from Mannheim Palace to Mannheim Main Station, and Campus West, consisting of the squares A5 and B6 which are in walking distance to the palace. Around 800 meters southwest of the university lies the Rhine River. Between 1955 and 1973, Mannheim Palace became the core of the UMA's campus. Today, it is home to the university's Business School, Law School, parts of the School of Humanities and the University Library.

In 2000, the UMA initiated the Renaissance des Barockschlosses (Renaissance of the Baroque Palace), a campaign aimed at raising funds for renovating and extending the main campus. With the €53 million raised, the university renovated 24 lecture halls, the palace facade and built a new library inside the palace. In 2007, a palace museum was opened in the central part of the building displaying the reconstructed historical halls and rooms of Elector Carl Theodor, who resided there from 1742 until 1777. In 2017, the university opened a new research and teaching building on square B6 and the Study and Conference Center of the Mannheim Business School behind the palace's West Wing.

Contemporary campus landmarks include the Mannheim Jesuit Church, the Mannheim Observatory, the original Antikensammlung (Collection of Antiquities) within the Mannheim Palace, the Anna Hoelzel Memorial, the Mannheim Palace Church, the Centre for European Economic Research, the Palais Bretzenheim, the Landgericht Mannheim (district court) and the Mannheim Schneckenhof.

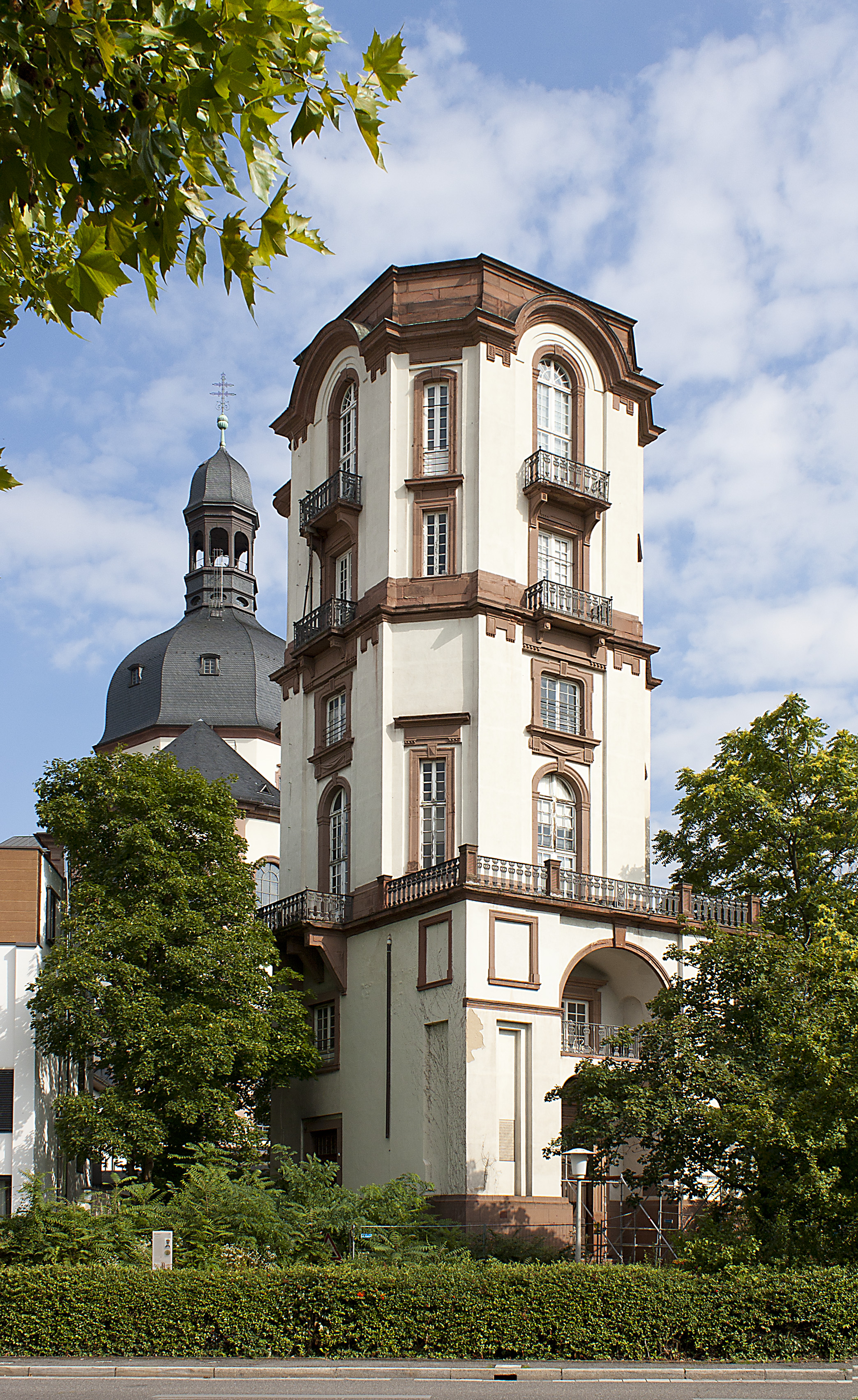
Mannheim Observatory

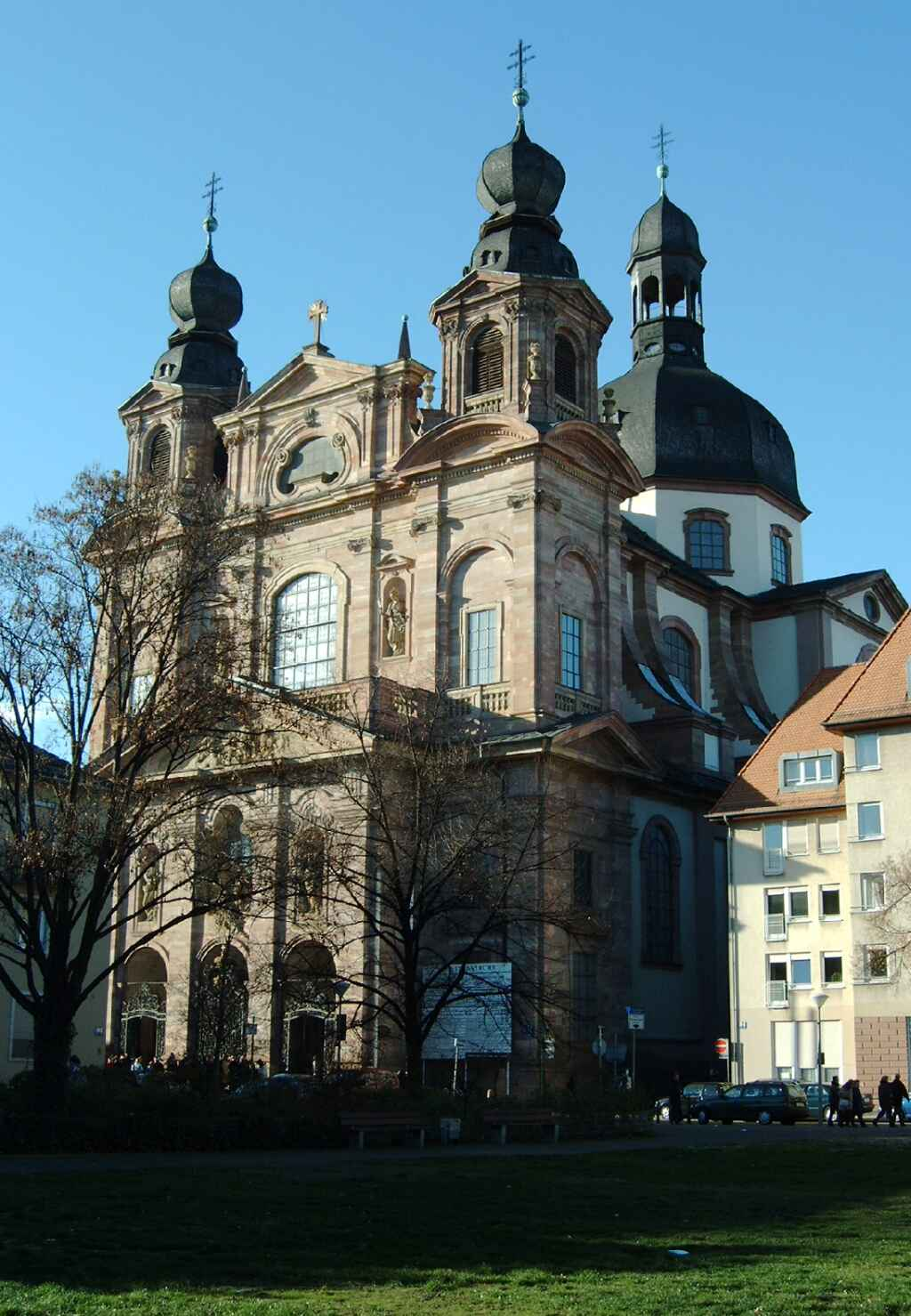
Jesuit Church, Mannheim

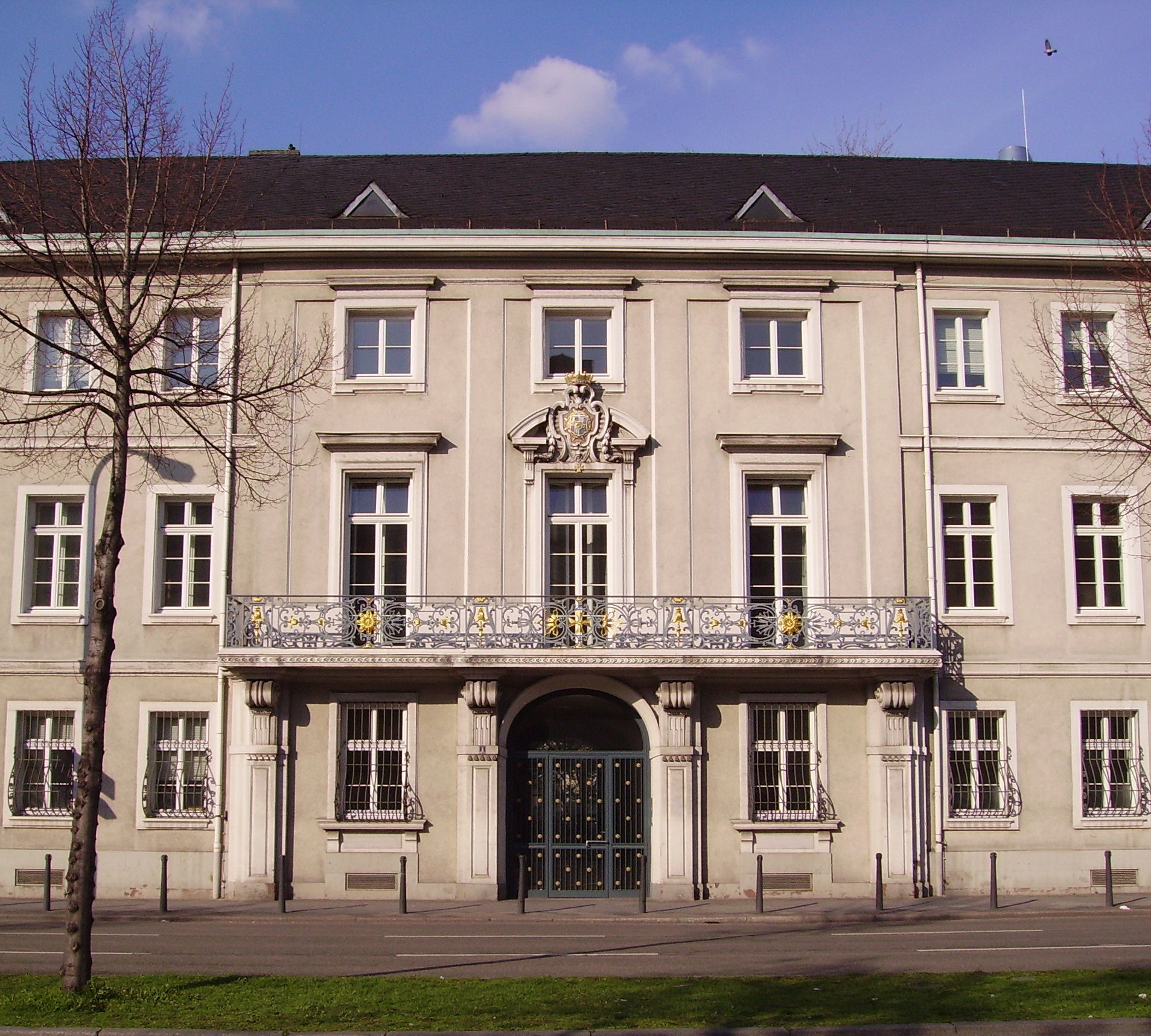
The Palais Bretzenheim

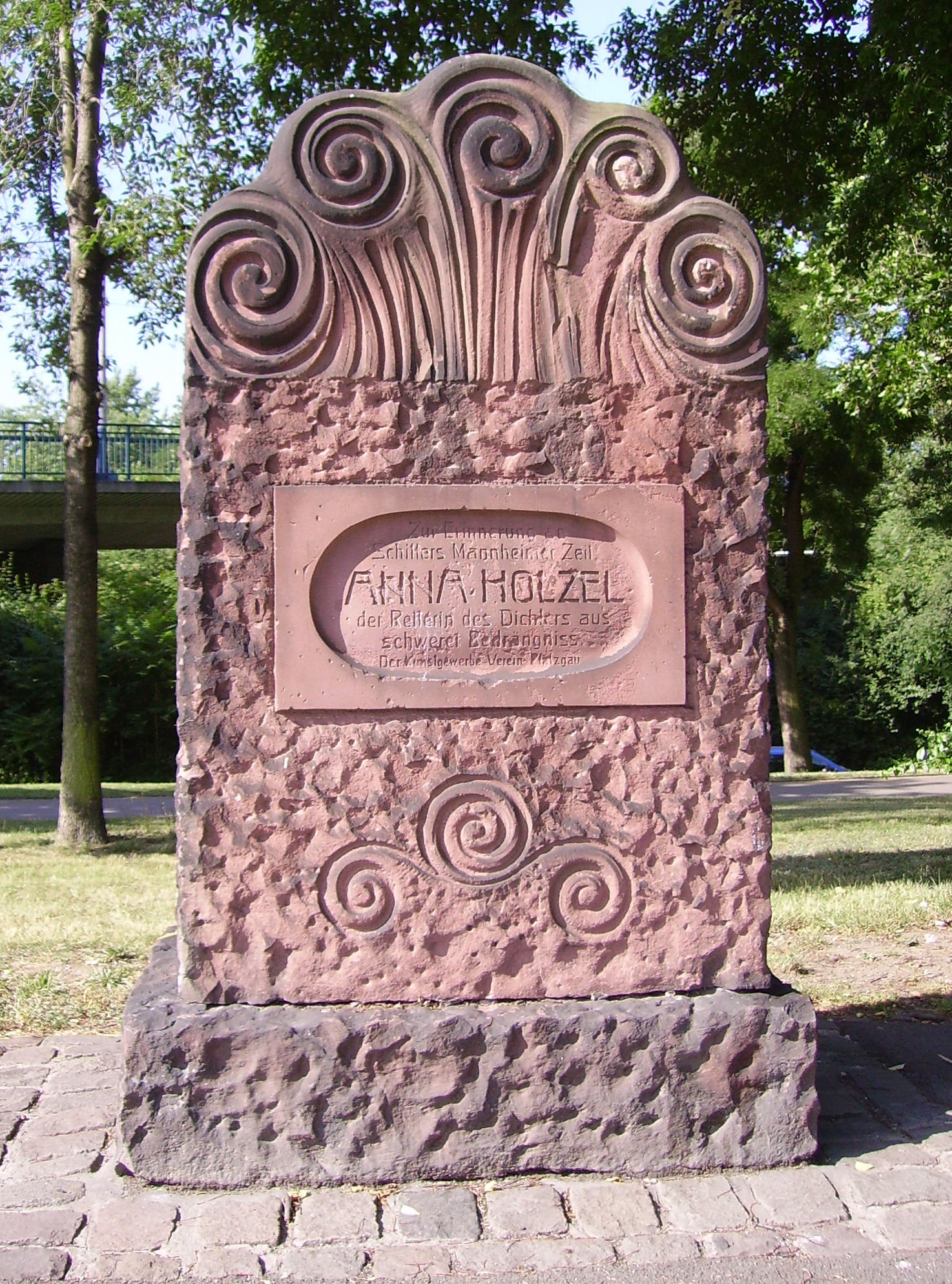
The Anna Hoelzel Memorial

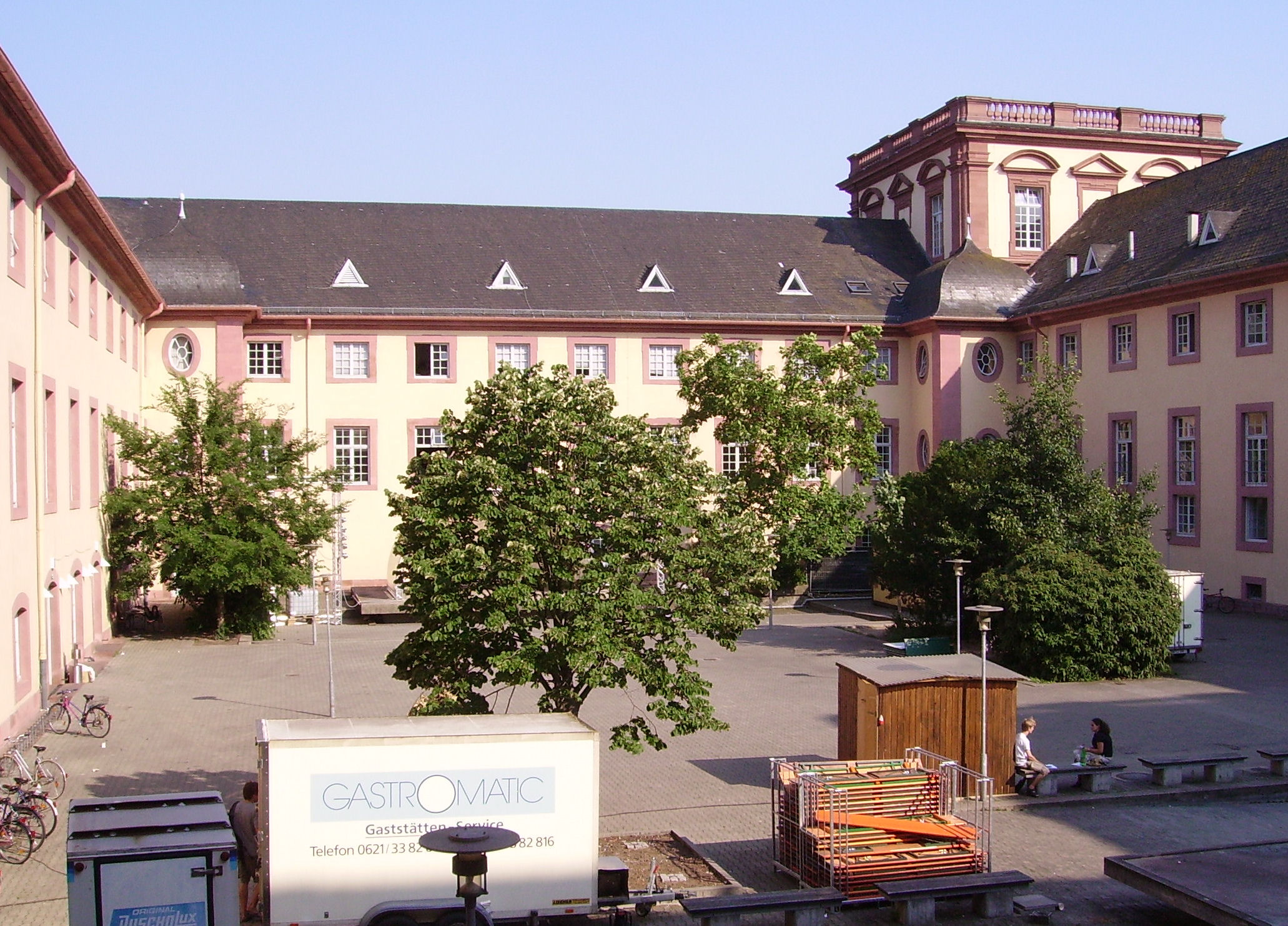
Mannheim Schneckenhof

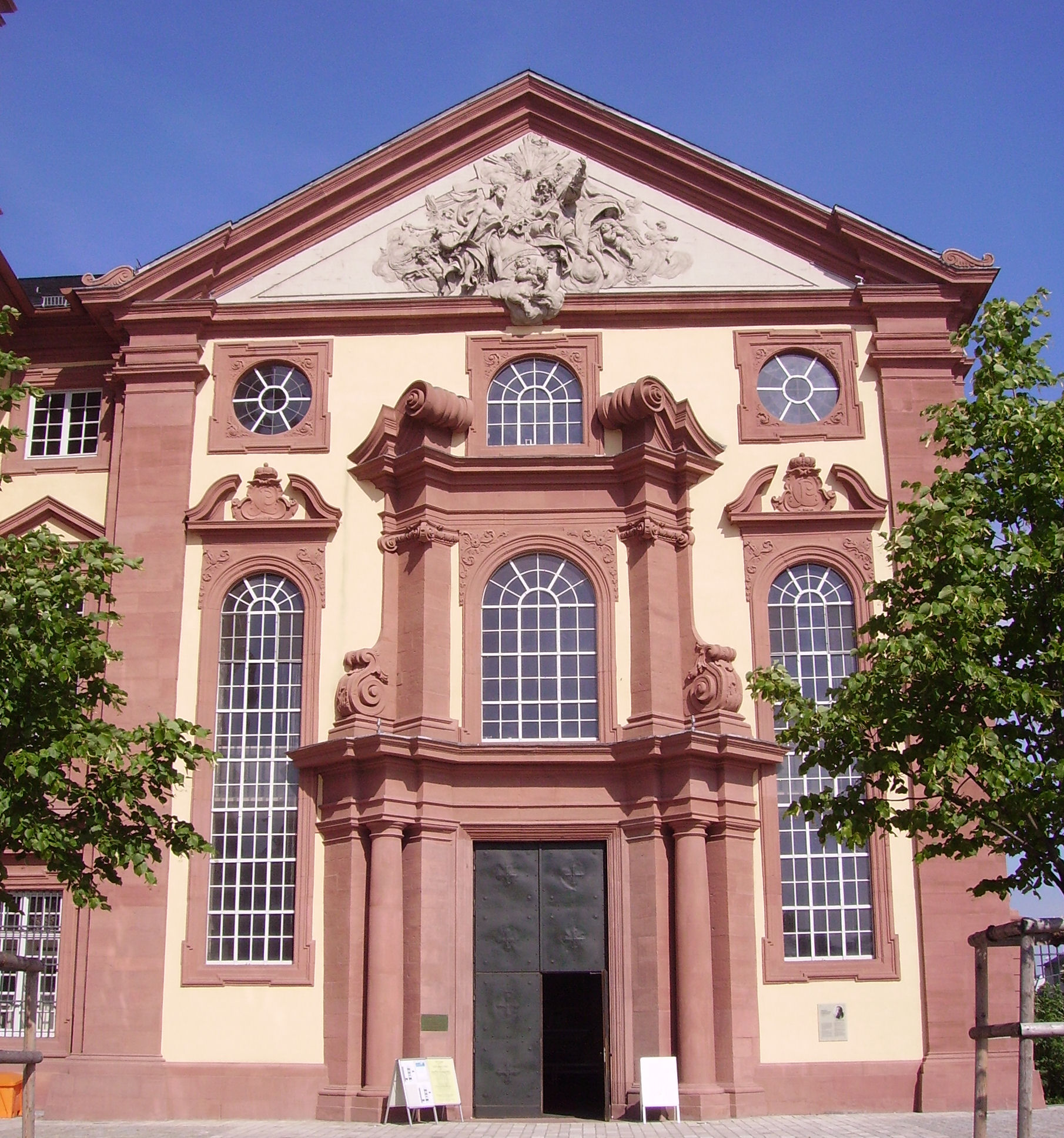
Mannheim Palace Church

== Organisation and administration ==
=== Schools and Graduate Colleges ===
The University of Mannheim is organized into five schools (Fakultäten):

- Business School (1963)
- School of Law and Economics (1963)
- School of Social Sciences (1963)
- School of Humanities (1963)
- School of Business Informatics and Mathematics (1967)

And two Graduate Colleges:

- Mannheim Business School (2005)
- Graduate School of Economic and Social Sciences (2007)
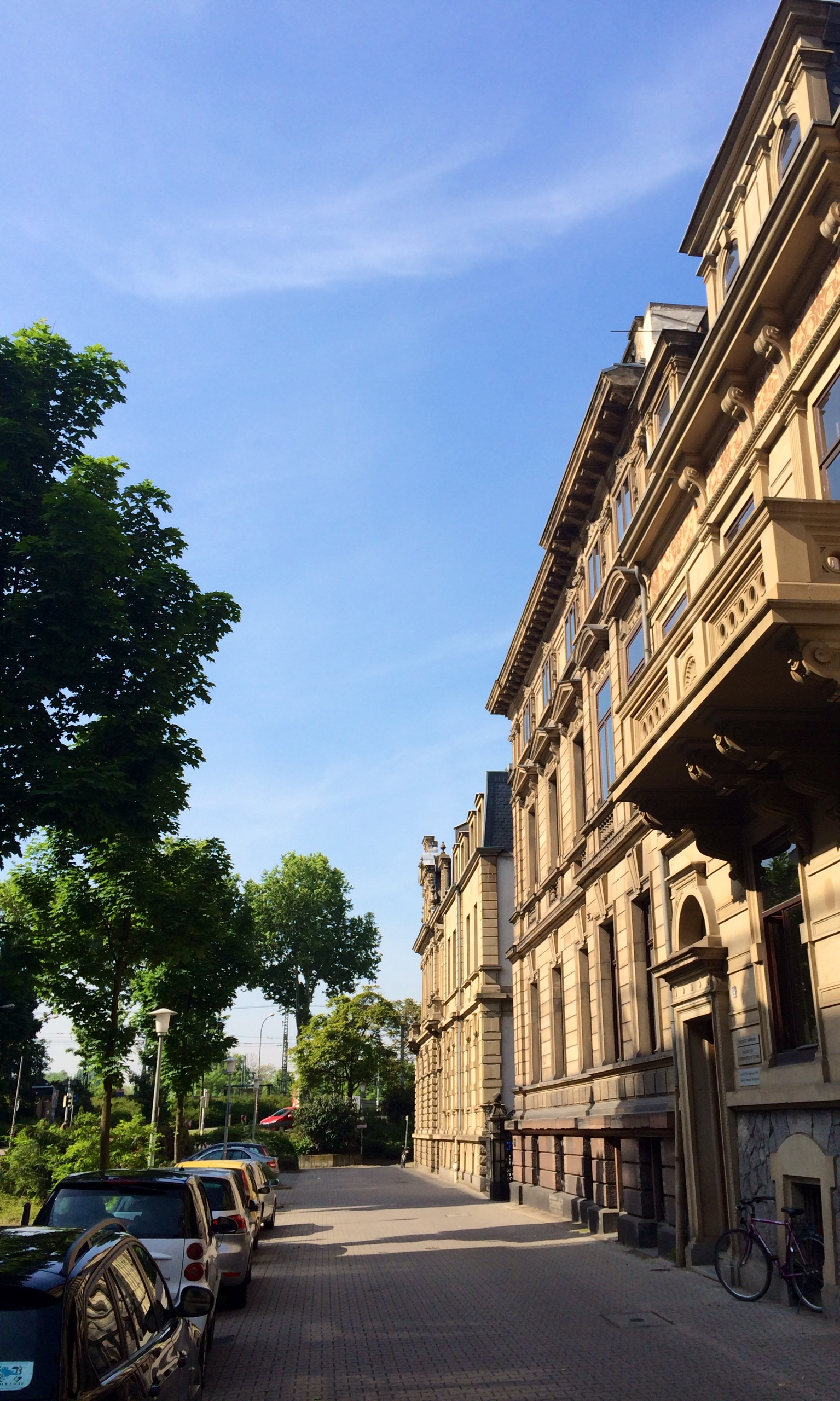
The Mannheimer Villen of the Business School

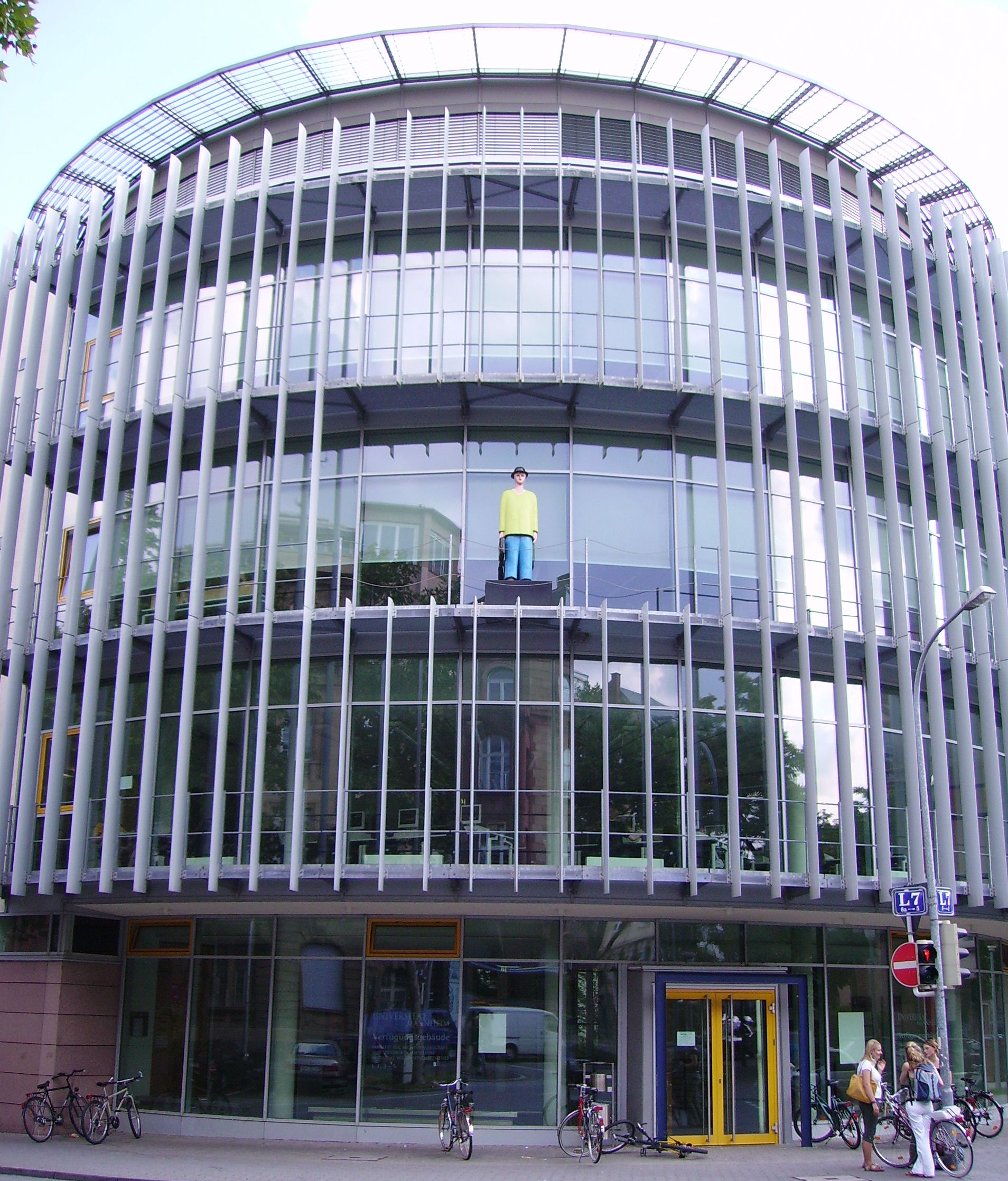
Department of Economics

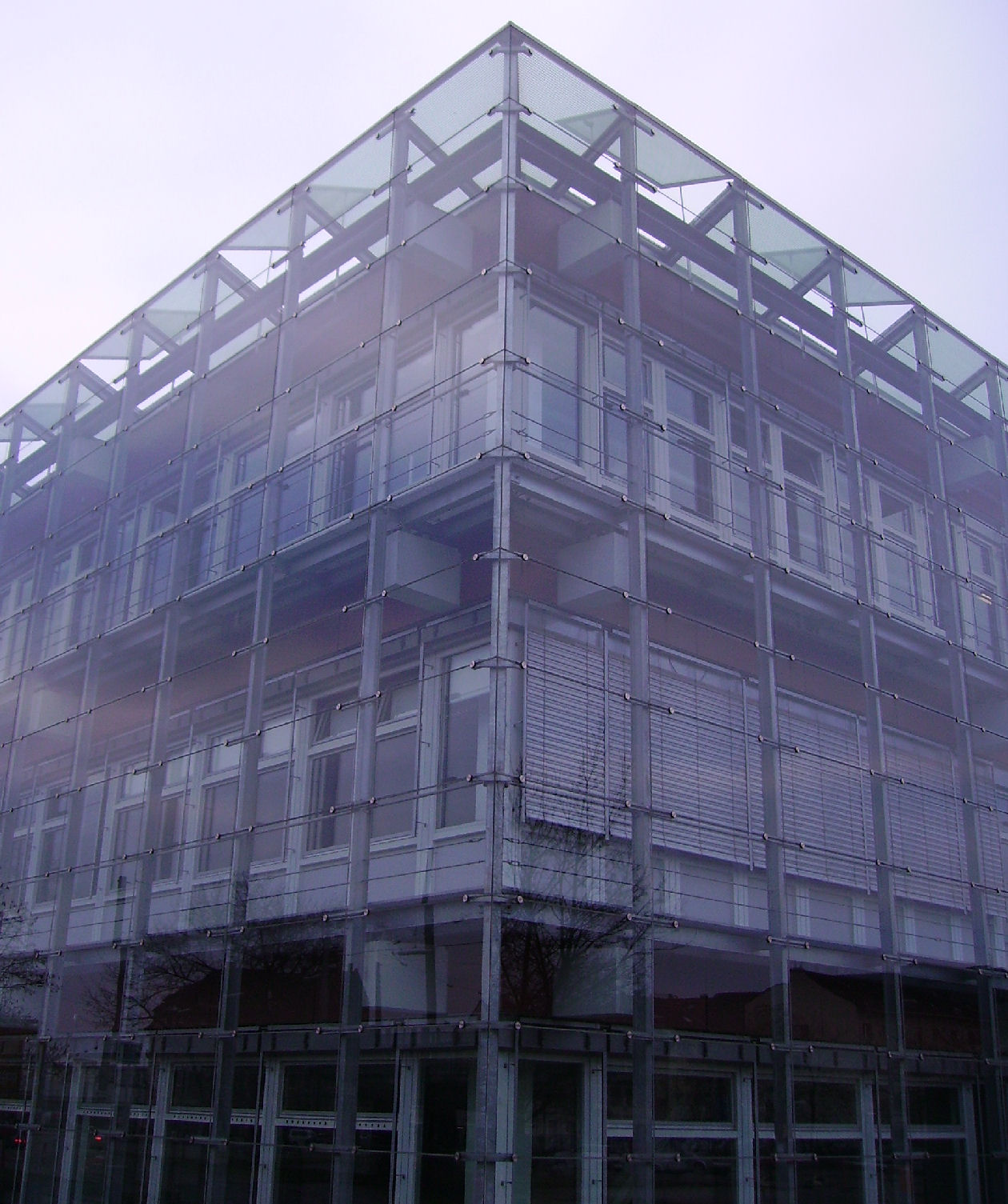
Glass Cube belonging to the School of Social Sciences

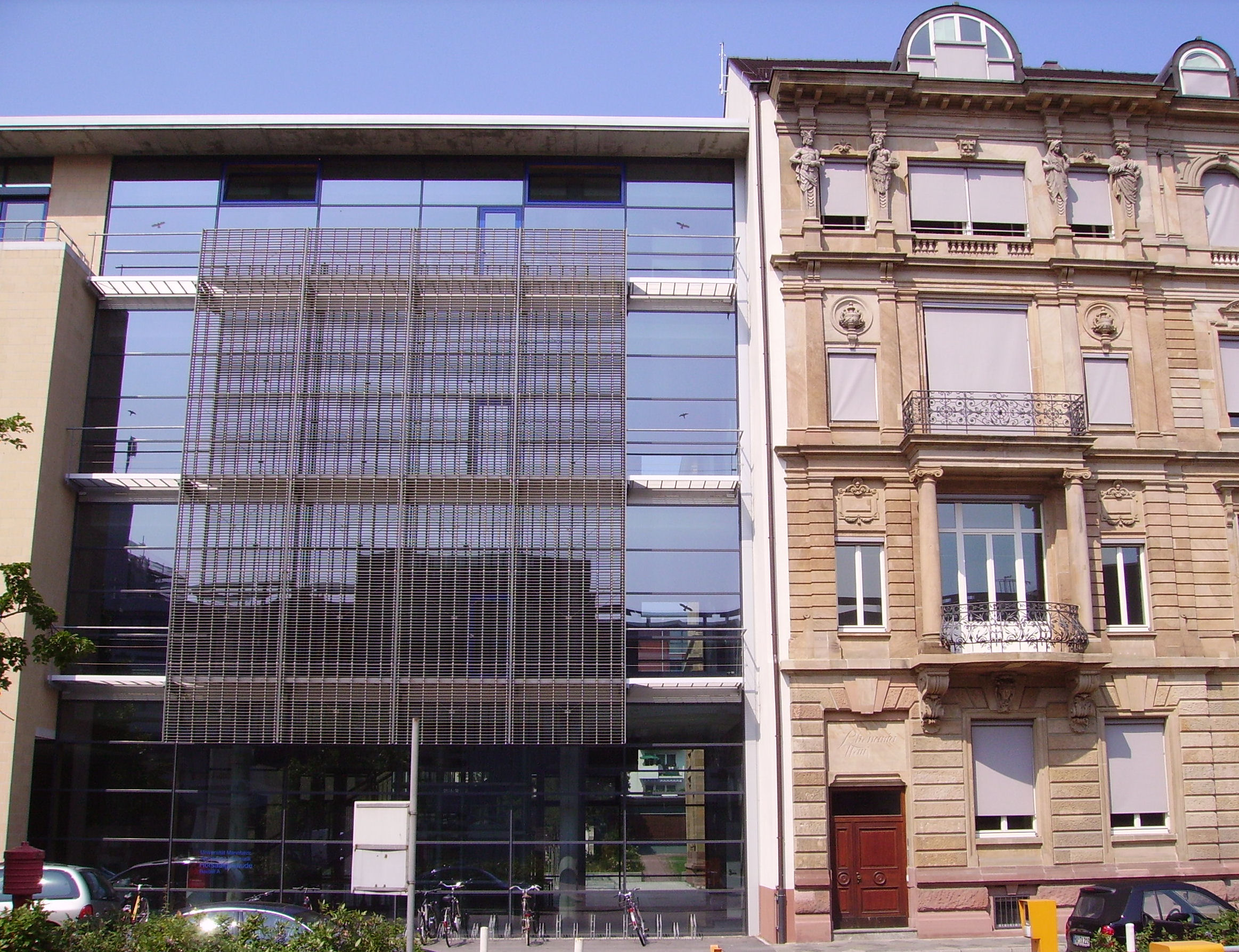
Mannheim School of Computer Science and Mathematics

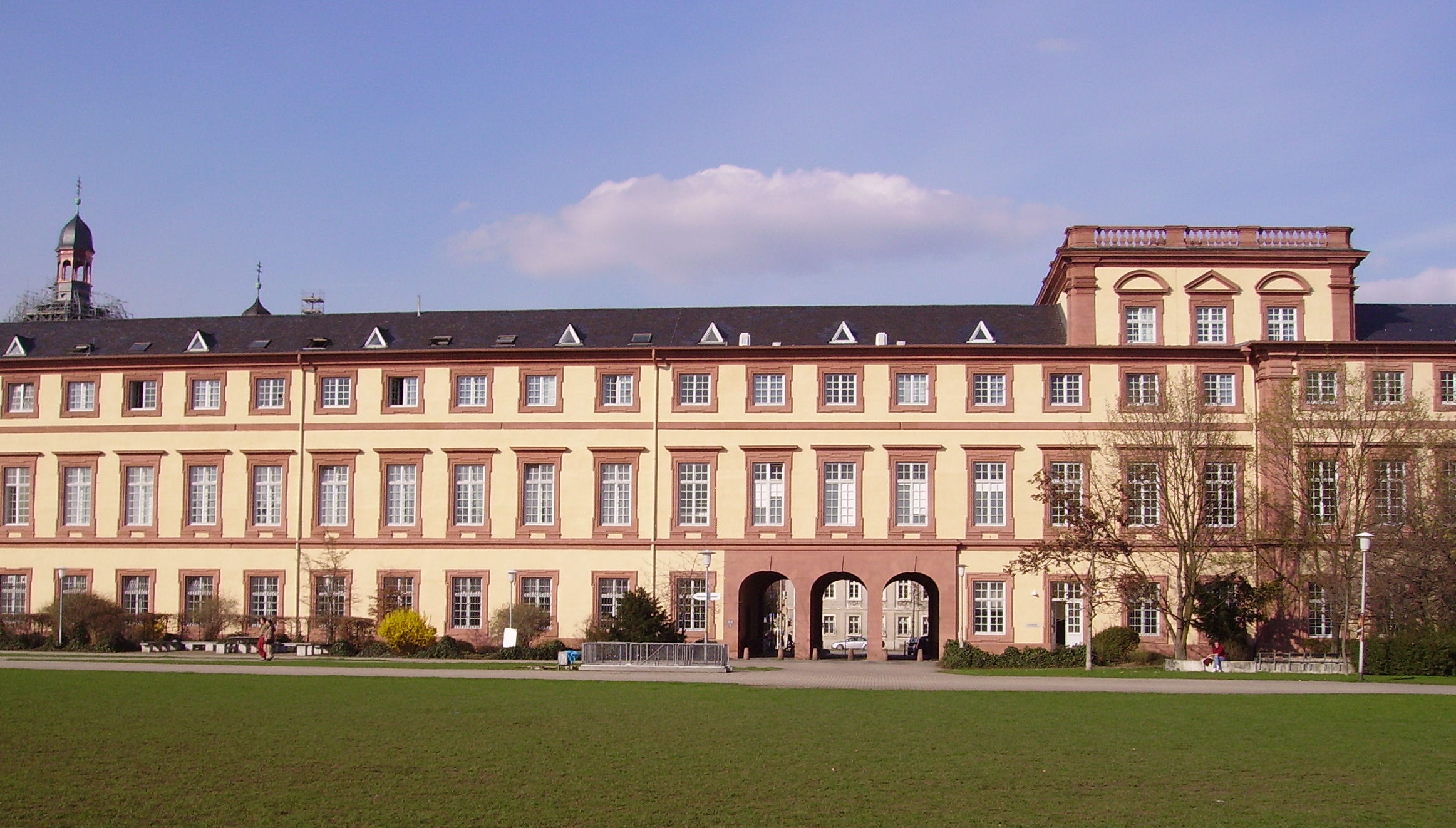
The Westflügel (West Wing) that hosts the department of law and the central lending library

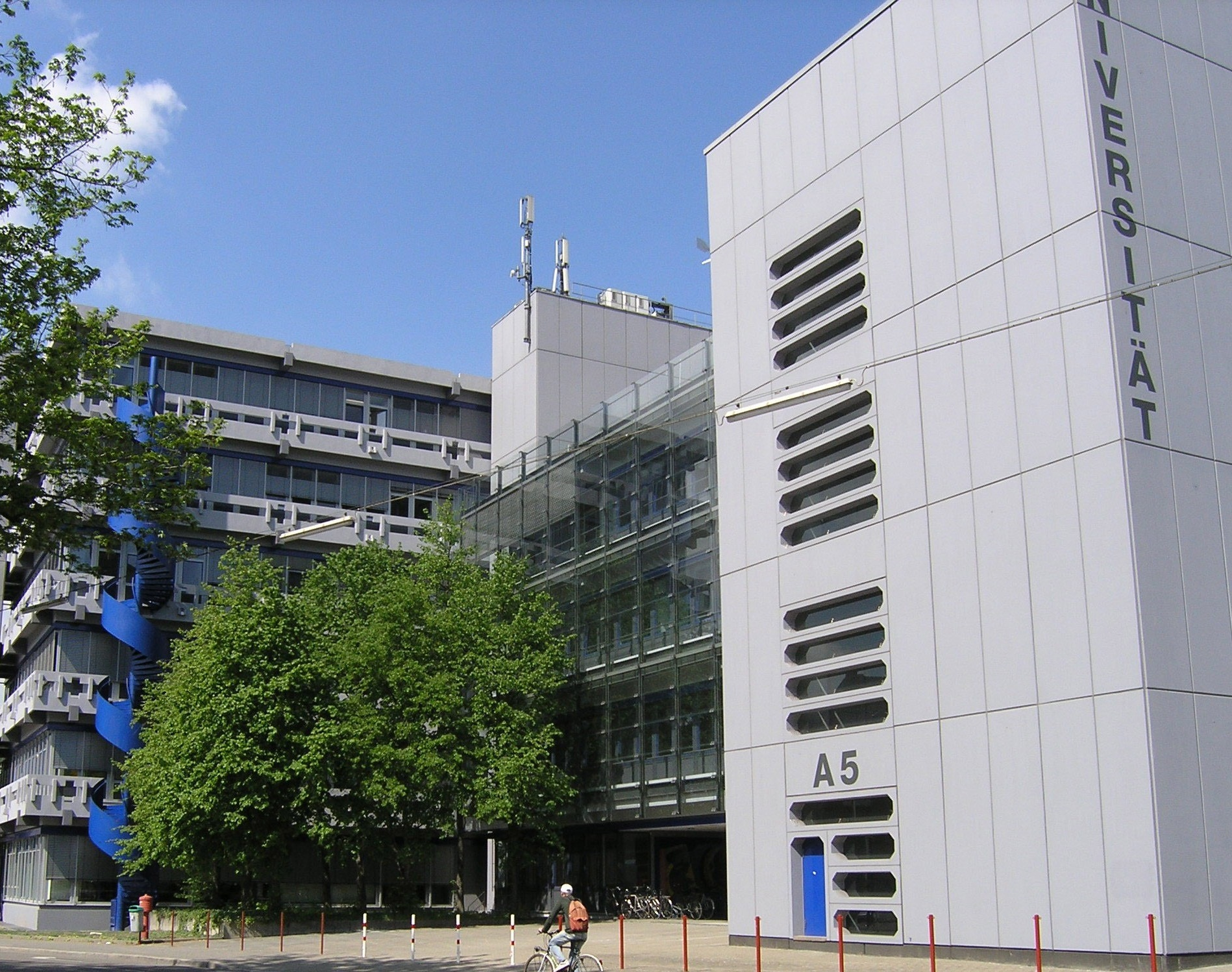
School of Social Sciences

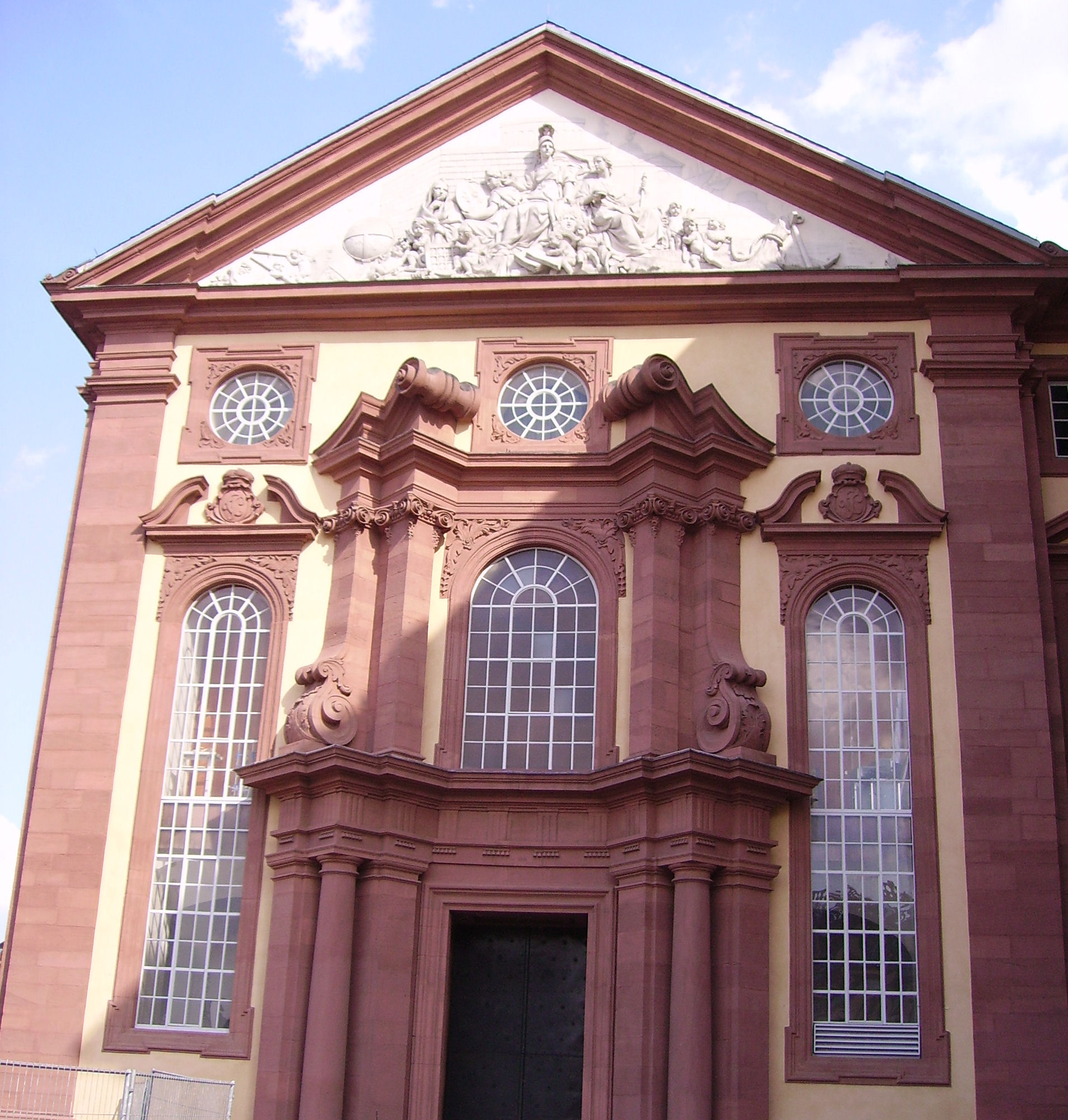
Entrance to the former Palace Library

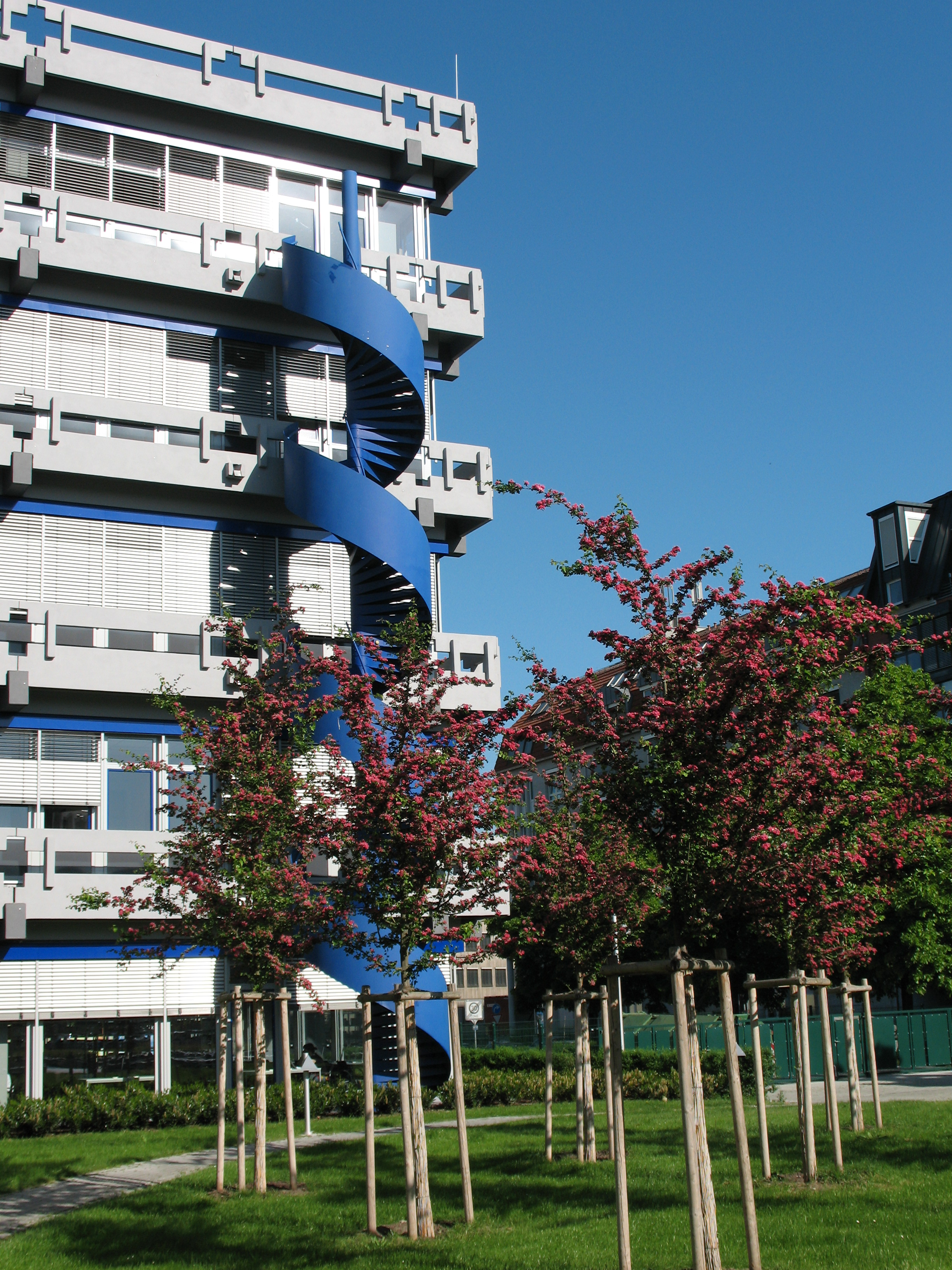
Mannheim Centre for European Social Research (MZES)

=== Governance ===
Rectors since the university's foundation
Years	Rector
1966–1967	Knut Borchardt
1967–1968	Rudolf Wildenmann
1968–1969	Rainer Gruenter
1969–1970	Hans-Martin Pawlowski
1970–1973	Gerhard Zeitel
1973–1976	Eduard Gaugler
1976–1979	Rudolf Wildenmann
1979–1982	Heinz König
1982–1985	Gerd Roellecke
1985–1988	Heinrich Chantraine
1988–1994	Otto H. Jacobs
1994–2001	Peter Frankenberg
2001–2012	Hans-Wolfgang Arndt
2012–2018	Ernst-Ludwig von Thadden
2018–2024	Thomas Puhl
2024–	Thomas Fetzer

The University of Mannheim is administered by the Rectorate, which comprises the Rector (President), three Pro-Rectors (Vice Presidents) and the Chancellor, who is also head of the central administration. The main task of the rectorate as executive body is to implement the strategic aims concluded by the University Council (Universitätsrat). Since October 2024 the UMA is headed by rector Thomas Fetzer.

The Senate is the "legislative branch" of the university. The rector and the members of the rectorate are senators ex officio, as are the deans of the faculties. Another 18 senators are elected for four-year terms, within the following quotas: nine university professors, three academic staff, three delegates of the student body, and three employees of the university administration. The University Council is the advisory board to the aforementioned entities.

The Allgemeiner Studierendenausschuss of the University of Mannheim (AStA) is the student government of the university. It is elected by the Student Parliament (StuPa) which in turn is elected by the entire student body. Elections are held each year. The AStA's task is representing the interests of the UMA students.

== Academic profile ==
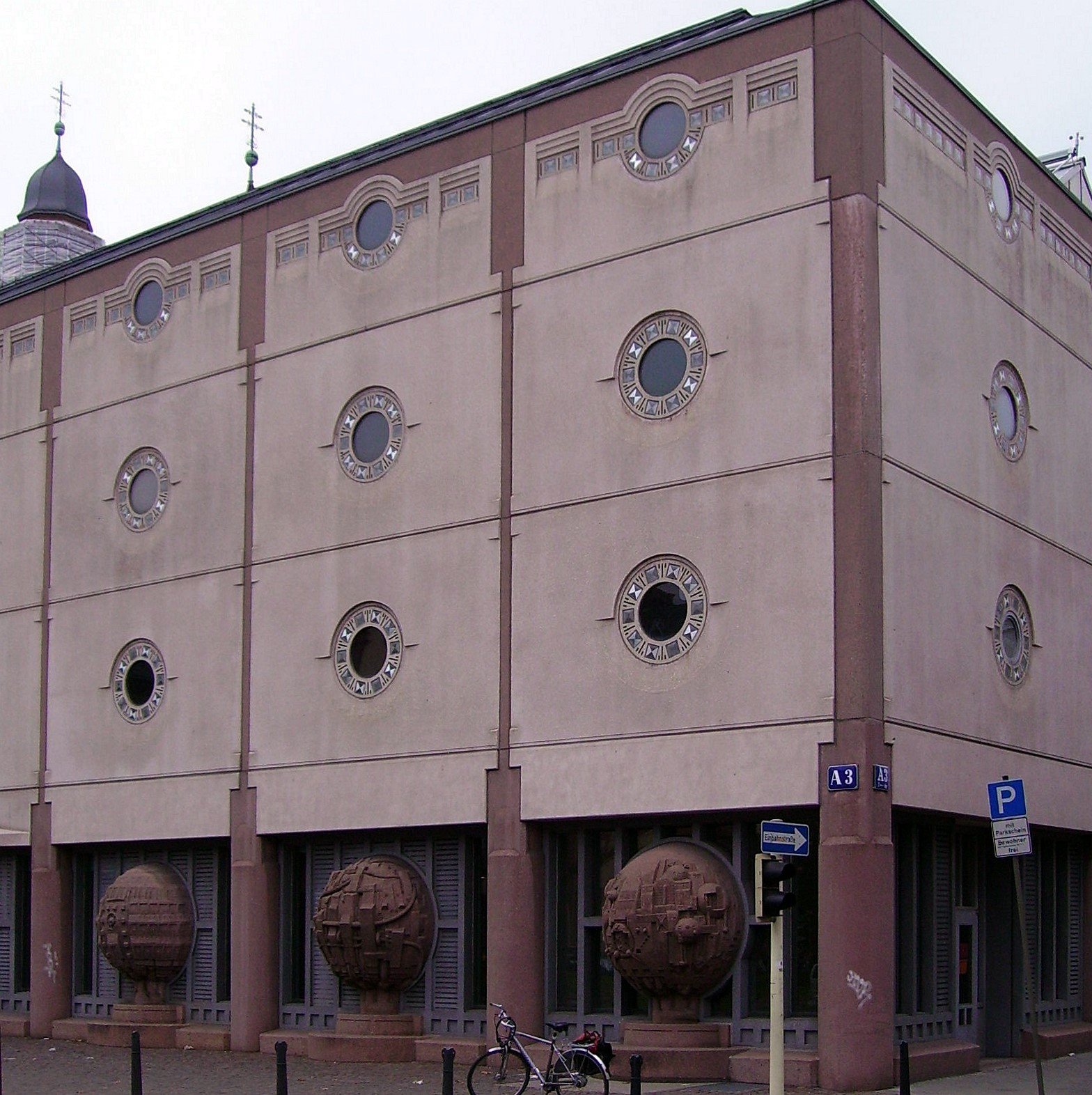
A3 Library that primarily hosts volumes of the humanities and social departments

The UMA offers undergraduate and graduate programs as well as Ph.D. degrees within business administration, economics, law, social sciences, humanities, mathematics, computer science and information systems. Many of the study programs combine non-economic subjects such as literature and cultural studies, law, mathematics and informatics with business studies and economics.

As of 2016, Mannheim was the only German university with an international academic calendar, which means that the academic year is divided into a fall and a spring term.

Since 2012, universities in the State of Baden-Württemberg do not charge any tuition fees. Excluded from this rule are non-EU citizens who since 2017 have had to pay a tuition fee of 1,500 Euro per semester according to state law.

The University of Mannheim has a scholarship system of its own consisting of various types of scholarships serving different needs.

=== Research institutes and affiliates ===
- GESIS – Leibniz Institute for the Social Sciences
- IDS – Institute of German Language
- IfM – Center for SME Research and Entrepreneurship
- IMU – Institute for Market-oriented Management
- InES – Institute for Enterprise Systems
- MaCCI – Mannheim Centre for Competition and Innovation
- MaTax – Leibniz ScienceCampus Mannheim Taxation
- MAZEM – Mannheim Center for Empirical Multilingual Research
- MCEI – Mannheim Center for Entrepreneurship and Innovation
- MZES – Mannheim Centre for European Social Research
- OSI – Otto-Selz-Institute of Applied Psychology
- ZEW – Centre for European Economic Research
- ZI – Central Institute of Mental Health

=== Rankings and reputation ===
University rankings

Overall – Global & National
QS World 2024	454	24
THE World 2024	=187	18

By subject – Global & National
QS Social Sciences & Management 2023	122	4
THE Business and Economics 2023	41	2
QS Business & Management Studies 2023	75	1
QS Economics & Econometrics 2023	43	2

The University of Mannheim has been featured in various international college and university rankings. In the 2024 edition of the QS World University Rankings, it was placed at the 454th position globally and ranked 24th in the national context. Concurrently, in the 2024 Times Higher Education World University Rankings, the institution received a global ranking of 187 and a national rank of 18.

In the QS Social Sciences & Management ranking of 2023, the university was globally ranked at 122nd, while being 4th nationally. The Times Higher Education 2023 rankings for Business and Economics placed the institution 41st globally and 2nd nationally. Moreover, in the 2023 rankings for Business & Management Studies and Economics & Econometrics, QS placed the university at 75th and 43rd globally, with national ranks of 1st and 2nd, respectively. In the 2022 ARWU Subject Ranking, the university ranks first in Germany in political science and finance.

QS Subject Ranking 2023
Subject	Global	National
Life Sciences & Medicine	N/A	N/A
Psychology	101–150	4–7
Social Sciences & Management	▼122	4
Accounting and Finance	▼80	1
Business and Management Studies	▼75	1
Communication and Media Studies	▼201–250	▼9–10
Economics and Econometrics	▲43	2
Politics	51–100	2–4
Sociology	▲101–150	▼5–8

THE Subject Ranking 2023
Subject	Global	National
Arts & humanities	201–250	▼18–20
Business & economics	▲41	▼2
Education	▲176–200	11–12
Social sciences	▼36	▼2
Computer science	▲151–175	▲11–14
Physical sciences	601–800	▲39–44
Psychology	▼68	▲3

ARWU Subject Ranking 2022
Subject	Global	National
Social Sciences
Economics	76–100	▲2–3
Political Sciences	▲37	▲1
Sociology	76–100	▼3
Education	201–300	▼8–15
Communication	▲38	3
Psychology	151–200	▼12–17
Business Administration	101–150	1–2
Finance	51–75	1
Management	201–300	4–8
Public Administration	▼151–200	▼8–10

The university's programs for social sciences, politics as well as business informatics rank nationwide within the Top 3 and its programs for law and computer science within the Top 10.

In 2008, the Business School was the first German institution to receive the "Triple Crown", that is accreditations by the world's three largest business school accreditation associations AMBA (UK), AACSB International (USA) und EQUIS (Belgium).

In the German CHE University Ranking 2017/2018, the psychology as well as the Romance languages department were ranked highest in Germany, receiving more top scores than any other institution of their discipline nationwide.

The university's Master in Management is ranked 14th in Europe by the FT. The university's business school is ranked 1st in Germany by the Eduniversal ranking and 34th worldwide.

== Student life ==
Demographics of student body
	Student Body	Germany Census
German	82.3%	80.5%
African	0.4%	0.7%
Asian	6.2%	2.5%
American	1.6%	0.5%
European	9.4%	14.3%

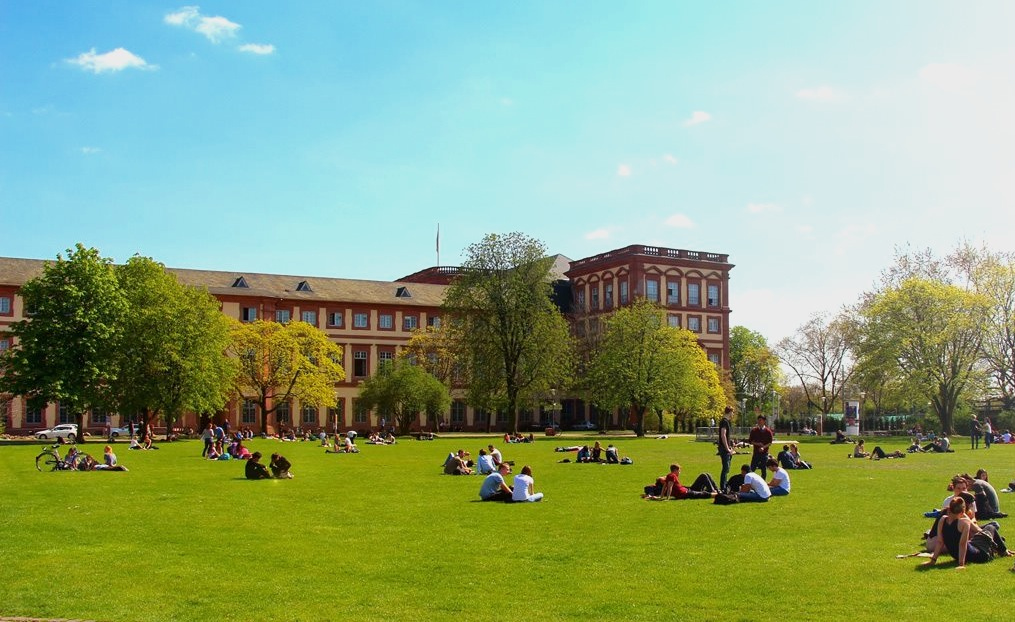
UMA students revising on Mannheim's Campuswiese

In the 2024 fall semester there were 11,933 enrolled students, of whom 15% came from abroad (588 exchange students and 1,198 directly enrolled at the university). More than 100 nationalities are represented in the UMA student body.

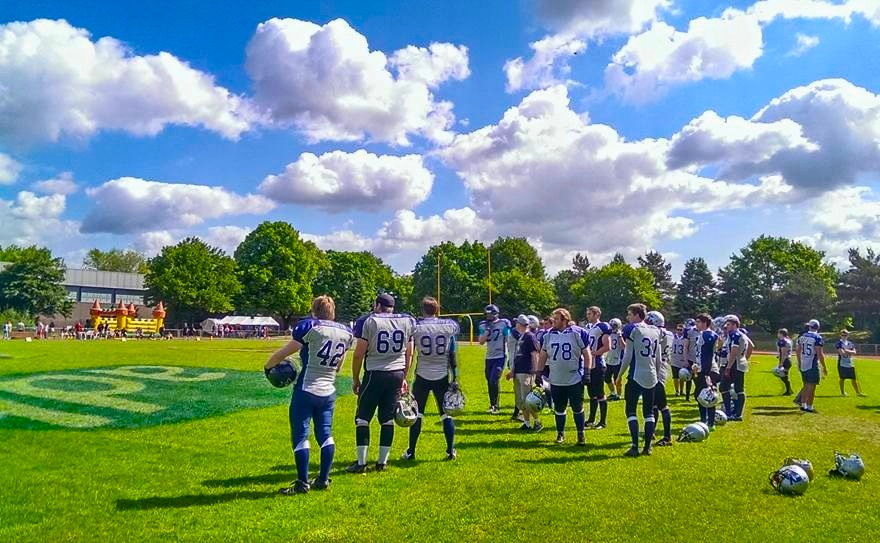
American Football team of the University, the Mannheim Knights

=== Student organizations ===
In 2018, there were about 50 active student organizations at the University of Mannheim. Among them are groups of different NGOs, such as the Amnesty International Student Initiative 1388 Mannheim, the UNICEF Student Initiative Mannheim, Model United Nations Mannheim or Enactus Mannheim, several departments of European and global student organizations, such as AEGEE Mannheim or AIESEC Mannheim, business or economics related student groups such as the Student Consultancy INTEGRA as well as initiatives focusing on community life, from helping deprived school children in Mannheim to welcoming refugees or incoming exchange students at the university.

The official organization of former students of the University of Mannheim is ABSOLVENTUM Mannheim, which was founded in 1995.

The Mannheim Forum is an economic congress organized by students.

Founded in 2016, Q-Summit is the biggest German innovation and entrepreneurship conference solely organized by students.

=== Sports and athletics ===
The university offers courses in 82 different athletic disciplines. For students most of the courses are free of charge. The sports programme includes ball sports, body fitness, self-defence and martial arts, outdoor sports, yoga, dance courses, water sports and E-Sports. The University of Mannheim also offers a sports scholarship for top-athletes at the university. In 2017, 55 students were funded, e.g., Lisa Hattemer (Artistic Cycling UCI World Champion 2016), Alexandra Burghardt (World Relay Champion 2017), Sarah Brüßler (U23 Kayak Vice World Champion 2017), Cécile Pieper (Indoor Hockey World Champion 2018) and Malaika Mihambo (Long Jump World Champion 2019)

=== Traditions ===
==== Schlossfest ====
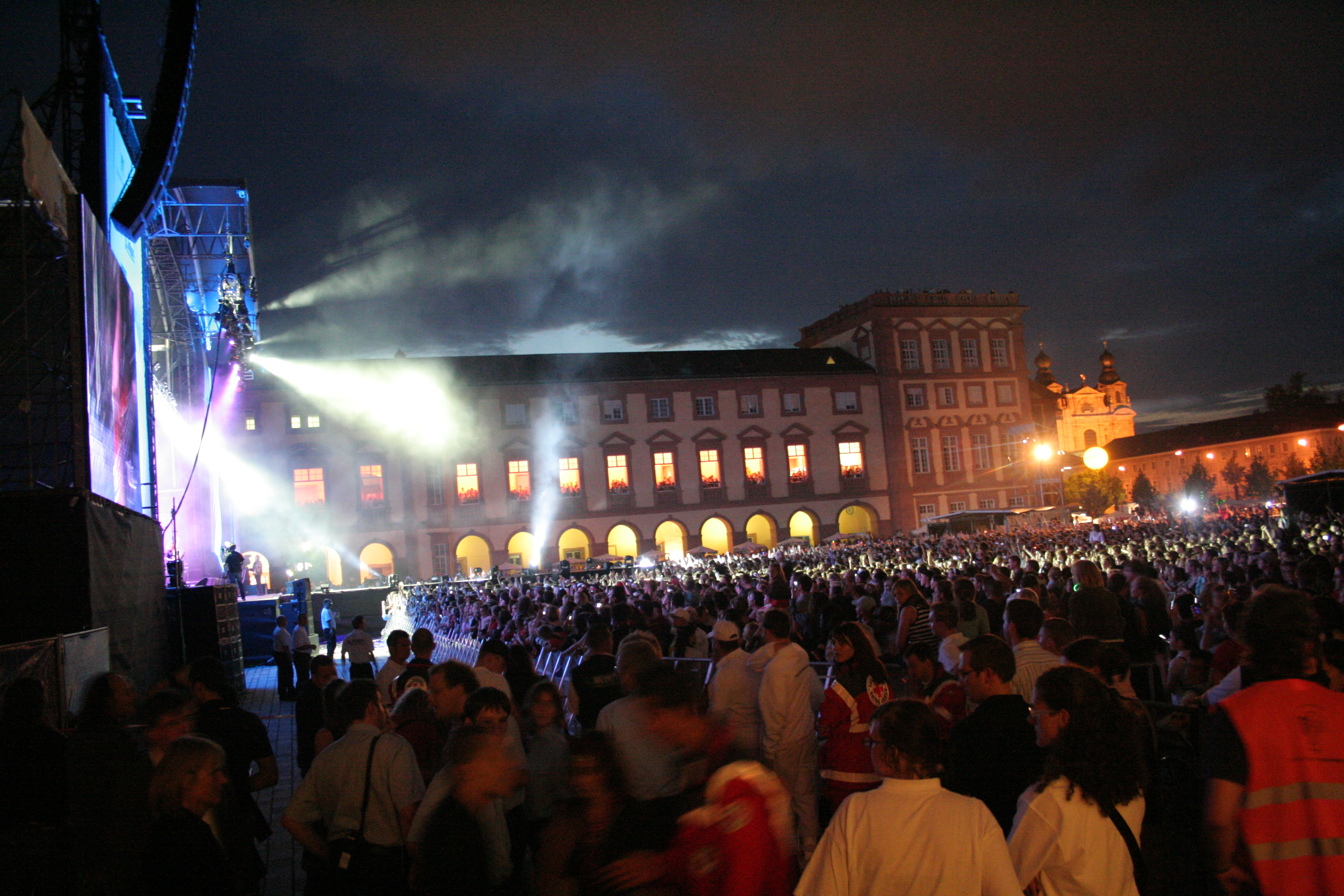
The Arena of Pop in 2007 on University of Mannheim's Ehrenhof

Each year the University of Mannheim hosts the Schlossfest (Palace Festival), a festival at which the Mannheim Palace campus is open to visitors and introduces the university to incoming freshmen. During the Schlossfest several arts, science and music events take place. The science events include live experiments and academic speeches regarding specific subjects, while the arts events include art exhibitions, workshops, dance acts, museum guides as well as guides through the old, non-public areas within the Mannheim Palace. In 2016, the Schlossfest counted about 20,000 visitors.

==== Schneckenhof Parties ====
Besides the Schlossfest the University has a long-established tradition of weekly Schneckenhof parties that usually take place Thursdays on UMA's quadrangle "the Schneckenhof" during the summer terms and in UMA's catacombs during the winter terms. The parties are regularly organized by the Fachschaften (student councils) of the different faculties. The tradition of conducting parties on the Schneckenhof dates back to the early 1970s. The first party was organized by the Norwegian students at the University of Mannheim, who were the largest group of international students until the late 1980s. The Norweger Parties (Norwegian Parties) still exist today. Normally, the event takes place during the academic summer at the Schneckenhof and is organized and hosted by Norwegian exchange students or Mannheim students with Norwegian background, in conjunction with international UMA societies. During the event the Schneckenhof is decorated in Norwegian themes and offers traditional beverages and food from Norway.

Another famous party is the "BWLer Fete" hosted by the Fachschaft BWL (Student Council of Business Administration) once each academic term. Each party usually ends at around 1am with the refrain of the song "Meine Stadt" by the Söhne Mannheims:

"Meine Stadt holt ihren Mann Heim, Ganz egal wo er auch ist.

Diesen Reim schickt ihr der Mann Heim, der sie so oft vermisst."

== Notable alumni and faculty members ==
Alumni and faculty of the University of Mannheim include many founders and businessmen as well as a large number of economists, philosophers, jurisprudents and social scientists. In business, Mannheim alumni and faculty notably include;

Stefan Lippe, CEO of Swiss Re; Claus E. Heinrich, board member of SAP; Henning Kagermann, former CEO of SAP; Claus Wellenreuther, co-founder of SAP; Jens Weidmann, economist and President of the Deutsche Bundesbank; Hans-Peter Wild, CEO of Rudolf Wild & Co.; Bruno Sälzer, CEO of Hugo Boss, CEO of Escada, Gitanas Nausėda, economist and President of Lithuania;

Alumni and faculty in the field of economics include; the President of the Ifo Institute for Economic Research Hans-Werner Sinn, the President of the ZEW Clemens Fuest, the President of the RWI Essen Christoph M. Schmidt, economists Axel Dreher, Isabel Schnabel and Horst Siebert, as well as the Gottfried Wilhelm Leibniz Prize winners Roman Inderst and Knut Borchardt.

Alumni and faculty in the field of computer science include; the Gottfried Wilhelm Leibniz Prize winners Joachim Weickert, as well as Hans Meuer, chairman of the International Supercomputing Conference.

== See also ==
- Rhine Neckar Metropolitan Area
- Education in Germany
- List of business schools in Europe
- List of University of Mannheim people
