= List of University of Mannheim people =

This list of notable people of University of Mannheim includes faculty, staff, graduates, administrators and former students in the undergraduate program and all graduate programs, and others affiliated with the University of Mannheim.

== Business ==
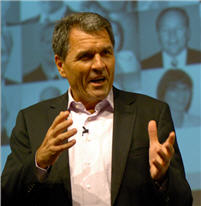
Dr. Claus E. Heinrich, former board member of SAP

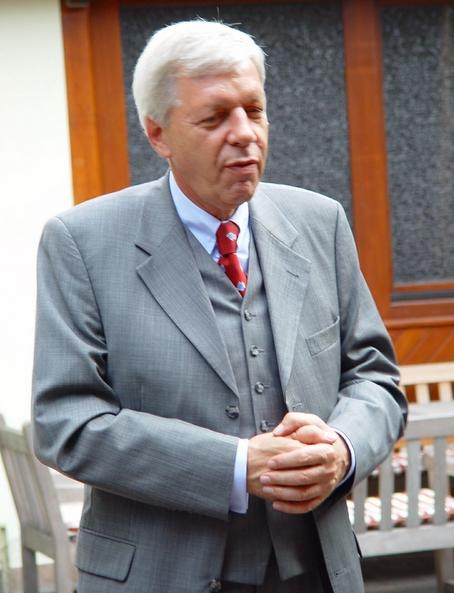
Werner Müller, former Federal Minister of Economics and Technology of Germany; CEO of Evonik

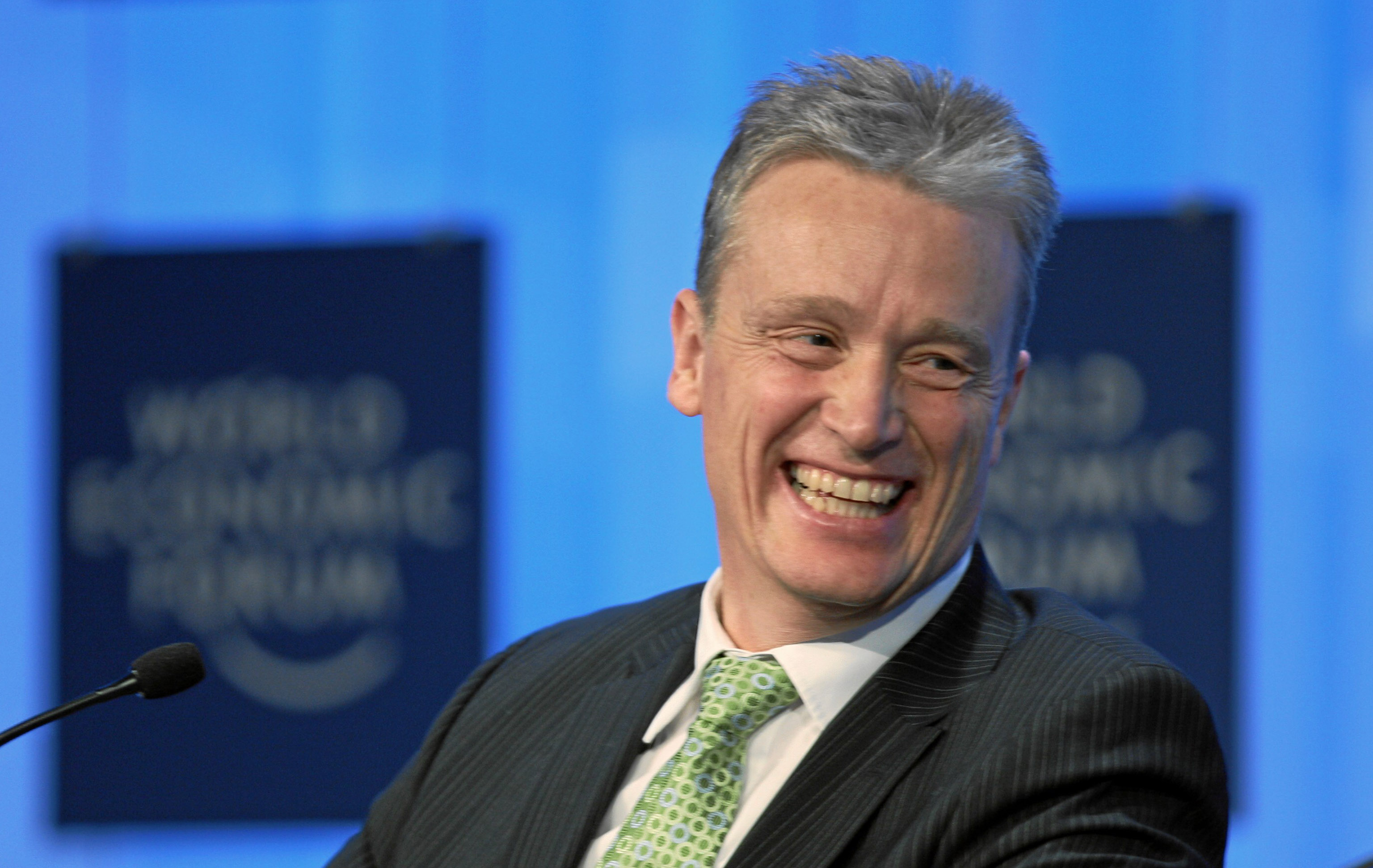
Stefan Lippe, former CEO of Swiss Re

- Klaus Diederichs, Head of European Investment Banking at JP Morgan Chase & Co. (2004–2014)
- Claus E. Heinrich, board member of SAP (1996–2009)
- Henning Kagermann, former professor and CEO of SAP (1998–2009)
- Stefan Lippe, CEO of Swiss Re (2009–2012)
- Bruno Sälzer, CEO of Hugo Boss (2002–2008); CEO of Escada (2008–present)
- Jürgen Schreiber, CEO of Edcon Limited and former CEO and President of Shoppers Drug Mart
- Stephan Sturm, Former managing director at Credit Suisse First Boston and CFO of Fresenius (2005–today)
- Hermann Ude, former CEO of DHL Global Forwarding; former board member of Deutsche Post
- Claus Wellenreuther, entrepreneur and co-founder of SAP
- Hans-Peter Wild, CEO and owner of Rudolf WILD GmbH & Co. KG

== Economics ==
- Werner Abelshauser, economic historian
- Elisabeth Altmann-Gottheiner, economist; first woman to become a university lecturer in Germany
- Irene Bertschek, economist; head of the Research Department Digital Economy at the ZEW – Leibniz Centre for European Economic Research in Mannheim; Professor of Economics of Digitalisation at University of Giessen
- Knut Borchardt, economist; former rector of the University of Mannheim; winner of the Gottfried Wilhelm Leibniz Prize
- Axel Dreher, economist; professor of international and development politics at the Ruprecht-Karl University of Heidelberg
- Wolfgang Franz, economist, chairman of the German Council of Economic Experts
- Clemens Fuest, economist, president of ZEW; former professor at Said Business School
- Eduard Gaugler, economist and former president of the UMA
- Roman Inderst, economist; winner of the Gottfried Wilhelm Leibniz Prize
- Heinz König, economist and former president of the University of Mannheim
- Christoph M. Schmidt, economist, president of the RWI Essen; member of the German Council of Economic Experts
- Isabel Schnabel, economist, professor of financial economics at the University of Mainz; member of the German Council of Economic Experts
- Horst Siebert, economist and member of the German Council of Economic Experts, 1990-2003
- Hans-Werner Sinn, economist and president of the Ifo Institute for Economic Research
- Jens Weidmann, economist and president of the Deutsche Bundesbank (2011–present)
- Jürgen Wolters, econometrician; former professor of econometrics at the Free University of Berlin
- Gerhard Zeitel, economist; former rector of the University of Mannheim

== Academics ==
- Hans Albert, philosopher
- Jutta Allmendinger, sociologist and President of Social Science Research Center Berlin
- Hubertus von Amelunxen, philosopher, art historian, and curator; Senior Curator at the Canadian Centre for Architecture, Montreal, 2001-2007; president and provost at the European Graduate School, Saas-Fee, 2013-2018
- Hans-Wolfgang Arndt, professor of corporate law; rector of the UMA, 2001-2012
- Norbert Bolz, philosopher; media theorist; professor at Technische Universität Berlin
- Kai Brodersen, ancient historian and classicist at the Faculty of the University of Erfurt
- Winfried Brugger, professor of public law
- Sabine Carey, Chair in Political Science IV
- Heinrich Chantraine, professor of geography; former Rector of the UMA
- Daniel Cremers, professor of computer science and mathematics at the Technical University of Munich
- Noël Martin Joseph de Necker, Belgian physician and botanist
- Thomas Diez, professor of political science and international relations at the Institute for Political Science, University of Tübingen
- Axel Dreher, German Economist, belongs to the IDEAS 500 top economists
- Bernhard Ebbinghaus, sociologist
- Peter Flora, former professor of sociology (1982–2009)
- Wolfgang Franz, German economist and former chairman of the German Council of Economic Experts
- Clemens Fuest, German Economist and Chairman of the ZEW
- Miles Hewstone, psychologist
- Klaus Hildebrand, liberal-conservative historian
- Christian Homburg, professor of marketing
- Kyra T. Inachin, historian
- Roman Inderst, German Economist and Winner of the Gottfried Wilhelm Leibniz Prize
- Marita Inglehart, psychologist, academic, and author
- Juliane Kokott, former professor of law
- Stefan Lucks, researcher in communications security and cryptography
- Thilo Marauhn, lawyer
- Wolfgang Männel, former professor of business administration at the University of Frankfurt and University of Dortmund
- Friedrich Kasimir Medikus, physician and botanist
- Hans Meuer, professor of computer Science; Chairman of the International Supercomputing Conference
- Christophe Neff, Franco-German geographer; scientist at the Karlsruhe Institute of Technology
- Heinz-Herbert Noll, sociologist
- Jonathan Pool, U.S. political scientist
- Franz Rothenbacher, sociologist
- Christoph M. Schmidt, German Economist and President of the RWI Essen
- Norbert Schwarz, Provost Professor in the Department of Psychology and the Marshall School of Business at the University of Southern California
- Otto Selz, former professor in psychology, philosophy and pedagogy
- Hans-Werner Sinn, German Economist and President of the Ifo Institute for Economic Research
- Ulrich Steinvorth, philosopher
- Rosemarie Tracy, linguist, acquisitionist and Wilhelm von Humboldt Prize awardee
- Hermann Weber, former historian and political scientist
- Joachim Weickert, professor of mathematics and computer science at Saarland University; Gottfried Wilhelm Leibniz Prize Laureate
- Helfrich Bernhard Wenck, German historian
- Ursula Wolf, former professor in Philosophy at the Free University of Berlin and University of Frankfurt
- Wolfgang Zapf, sociologist
- Klaus F. Zimmermann, German economist, professor for economics at the University of Bonn and former president of the DIW Berlin

== Politics, civil services and military ==
- Alexander Nuno Alvaro, politician
- Franziska Brantner, politician, member of the Bundestag
- Jürgen Creutzmann, politician
- Oskar Dirlewanger, military officer, Commander of the infamous Nazi SS penal unit "Dirlewanger Brigade" during World War II
- Florian Gerster, politician
- Maciej Golubiewski (born 1976), Polish political scientist and Consul General at the Consulate General of the Republic of Poland in New York City
- Hans-Olaf Henkel, President of the Leibniz Association; candidate of the Alternative for Germany for the 2014 European Parliament election
- Christine Lambrecht, first female Chief Whip of the SPD; member of the Bundestag
- Gaspar Martins, Angolan diplomat and political figure; Angola's Permanent Representative to the United Nations since 2001
- Onésimo Redondo, Spanish Falangist Fascist politician; founder of Juntas Castellanas de Actuación Hispánica (Castilian Groups of Hispanic Action)
- Christian von Stetten, politician, entrepreneur and member of the Bundestag
- Jürgen Walter, politician

== Culture, sports and entertainment ==
- Christian Baracat, international rugby union player
- Artem Klein, ice hockey player
- Philipp Laux, footballer; psychologist of RB Leipzig
- Alessa Ries, retired swimmer; won a gold medal in the 4 × 200 m Freestyle Relay at the 2002 European Aquatics Championships
- Dieter Roth, Swiss artist

== Honorary doctorates ==
- Richard Blundell, British economist and econometrician
- Hans Leonhard Hammerbacher, former president of DIHK (Association of German Chambers of Industry and Commerce)
- Richard Lenel, former chairman of the Chamber of Commerce; honorary citizen of the city of Mannheim
- Kurt Lotz, second post-war CEO of Volkswagen
- Hans Carl Nipperdey, German labour law expert; former president of the Federal Labour Court
- Torsten Persson, Swedish economist and Director of the Institute for International Economic Studies at Stockholm University
- Edmund Phelps, American economist; winner of the 2006 Nobel Memorial Prize in Economic Sciences
- Hans Reschke, former Lord Mayor of Mannheim
- Jean Tirole, French professor of economics; winner of the 2014 Nobel Memorial Prize in Economic Sciences

== See also ==
- University of Mannheim
- Mannheim Business School
