= German Ethics Council =

German Ethics Council (German: Deutscher Ethikrat) (Precursor from June 2001 to February 2008: National Ethics Council of Germany) is an independent council of experts in Germany addressing the questions of ethics, society, science, medicine and law and the probable consequences for the individual and society that result in connection with research and development, in particular in the field of the life sciences and their application to humanity.

The Ethics Council Act (Act on the Establishment of the German Ethics Council, in German: Gesetz zur Einrichtung des Deutschen Ethikrats (Ethikratgesetz – EthRG)), that entered into force on 1 August 2007, forms the basis for its activities.

Half of the 26 members are proposed by the Federal Government, while the other half of the 26 members is proposed by the Bundestag. The members of the German Ethics Council are then designated by the President of the Bundestag for four years. Through this procedure, different ethical approaches and a pluralistic spectrum of opinion should be represented. Independence is to be ensured, amongst others, by prohibiting the members to belong to the Federal Parliament or the Federal Government or to a Federal States’ Parliament or Government respectively.

== Tasks ==
The German Ethics Council fulfils a dual function as a forum for dialogue and an advisory body. In its function as an ethical dialogue forum, the German Ethics Council is intended, in accordance with its legal basis, to bring together specialist scientific discourses and to promote the debate in society, particularly through public events. In its function as a bioethical advisory body, the German Ethics Council has the task of drawing up statements and recommendations for political or legislative action. The Council ensures cooperation with other ethics bodies at national and international level.

The German Ethics Council acts either on its own initiative or mandated by the federal government and the German Bundestag. The council reports once a year to the German Bundestag and the federal government on its activities and the state of the debate in society.

In order to inform the public and encourage discussion in society, the council organises public events and provides information about its activities on its website, in its newsletter and annual report. Besides a series of public evening events called "Bioethics Forum" and its annual meeting – both taking place in Berlin – the council also organises public events outside of Berlin.

== Functioning ==
Generally, the council meets once a month; meetings are open to the public. In addition to these plenary sessions, the work on content is mainly carried out in working groups which are formed by decision of the plenary session on specific topics and meet at irregular intervals. The work of the council is supported by an administrative office, which is located in Berlin at the Berlin-Brandenburg Academy of Sciences and Humanities (in German: Berlin-Brandenburgische Akademie der Wissenschaften).

In 2018, the budget of the German Bundestag provided 1.895 million Euros for the council's work.

=== Annual and Autumn Conferences ===
Once a year, a public annual conference of the German Ethics Council takes place in Berlin; together with external experts, the German Ethics Council advises and discusses in a full-day event on its current topics. An additional Autumn Conference addresses participants at varying locations throughout Germany. Conference topics of the last years were:

- Knowledge and Power – Science in Politics and Society (2025)
- Successful Solidarity (2025)
- Loneliness – Existential Experience and Societal Challenge (2024)
- Lost in "Metaverse’’? On the Intertwining of Real and Digital Worlds (2023)
- One Health: Health for All and Everything? (2023)
- Meet the German Ethics Council! Our Life in the Pandemic (2022)
- Steep Prices – Speedy Recovery? Towards Fair Pricing of Expensive Medicines (2022)
- The Quantified Self: Ethics and Aesthetics of Altered Corporeality (2021)
- To Your Health! Dimensions of Nutritional Responsibility (2021)
- Thinking – Believing – Knowing: Climate Change and the Ethics of Science (2019)
- Care – Robot – Ethics. Ethical Challenges in the Technologisation of Care (2019)
- and more.

=== Bioethics Forums ===
In addition, the Council organizes a series of public evening events in Berlin called Bioethics Forums. These events, usually introduced by guest lecturers, aim at publicly discussing concrete biopolitical issues. Topics of the last years were: Reproductive Medicine and Debate Culture (2024), Patient-Oriented Data Use (2023), Good to Know? On the Responsible Use of Non-Invasive Prenatal Testing (NIPT) (2022), Triage – Prioritising Intensive Care Resources under Pandemic Conditions (2021), Who First? Allocation of Vaccines against SARS-CoV-2 (2020), Transgender Identity in Children and Adolescents (2020), Advantages and disadvantages of opt-out organ donation (2018), Rare diseases (2018), Egg donation abroad and the consequences of this practice in Germany (2017), Antibiotic resistance (2016), Disease mongering (2015), People with disabilities – a challenge for hospitals (2014).

=== Further Events ===
Further formats include: hearings with experts, usually in the course of preparing Opinions; online events, for example in December 2023 on the topic of "AI in the Classroom – Ethical Questions on ChatGPT and Similar Applications".

== Members ==
The German Ethics Council consists of 26 members who shall exercise their office in person and independently. They may not belong either to the Federal Parliament or the Federal Government or to a Federal States’ Parliament or Government respectively. They represent scientific, medical, theological, ethical, social, economic and legal concerns in a particular way and ensure a variety of ethical approaches and a pluralist spectrum of opinions. The members are appointed for a period of four years. A one-time reappointment is possible. If a member resigns prematurely, a new member is appointed for four years.

=== Members since October 2024 ===
The appointment of the members of the Ethics Council, which usually takes place in April, was delayed in 2024 and did not take place until October 2024. Although the Bundestag had proposed 11 members at the beginning of June, the 10 proposals of the federal government were still pending before the President of the Bundestag, Bärbel Bas, could appoint all members. Only the four members appointed during the current period, 2020 to 2024, Elisabeth Gräb-Schmidt, Armin Grunwald, Mark Schweda and Judith Simon, remained in office until then. After of 29 September 2024, the four remaining members issued a press release calling on the Federal Government to act.

After the Federal Government named its candidates in mid-October 2024, six months late, all members were appointed by the President of the Bundestag, Bärbel Bas, with effect from 10 October for the new term of office. Since the AfD-proposed gynaecologist Ronald Weikl, who was sentenced to a suspended prison term for issuing unlawful certificates for exemption from the mask requirement, was rejected by the Bundestag, the Ethics Council has only 25 members instead of 26.

On 15 November 2024, the council members elected law professor Helmut Frister as its chair. The neuroscientist Susanne Schreiber, the philosopher and digital ethicist Judith Simon, and the medical doctor and ethicist Eva Winkler were appointed as deputy chairs.

- Prof. Dr. Dr. h.c. Jutta Allmendinger
- Prof. Dr. Rana Alsoufi (since April 2026)
- Regional Bishop Dr. phil. Petra Bahr (reappointed; member until May 2025)
- Prof. Dr. phil. Cornelia Betsch
- Prof. Dr. iur. Hans-Georg Dederer
- Dr. rer. nat. Uta Eser
- Prof. Dr. Aldo Faisal
- Military Bishop Dr. theol. Bernhard Felmberg (since December 2025)
- Prof. Dr. iur. Helmut Frister (reappointed)
- Prof. Dr. rer. pol. Nils Goldschmidt
- Prof. Dr. theol. Elisabeth Gräb-Schmidt (reappointed November 2018)
- Prof. Dr. rer. nat. Armin Grunwald (14 February 2021 until 13 February 2025)
- Prof. Dr. med. Winfried Hardinghaus
- Dr. phil. Ute Kalender
- Hedy Kerek-Bodden
- Prof. Dr. phil. Armin Nassehi
- Prof. Dr. phil. habil. Annette Riedel (reappointed)
- Prof. Dr. iur. Dr. phil. Frauke Rostalski (reappointed)
- Prof. Dr. rer. soc. Dr. theol. Jochen Sautermeister (since 1 March 2025)
- Prof. Dr. theol. Kerstin Schlögl-Flierl (reappointed)
- Prof. Dr. rer. nat. Susanne Schreiber (reappointed)
- Dr. med. Dr. h.c. Josef Schuster (reappointed)
- Prof. Dr. phil. Mark Schweda (since 10 June 2022)
- Prof. Dr. phil. Judith Simon (reappointed 1 July 2022)
- Prof. Dr. phil. Muna Tatari (reappointed; member until 5 March 2025)
- Prof. Dr. iur. Gregor Thüsing
- Prof. Dr. Achim Wambach
- Prof. Dr. med. Dr. phil. Eva Winkler

=== Members 2020–2024 ===
The President of the German Bundestag, Wolfgang Schäuble, appointed 21 members to the German Ethics Council as of 30 April 2020. Several members had reached the end of their terms with the body on 10 April 2020, among them the previous chairman Peter Dabrock. Including three members who were appointed outside the regular cycle between 2016 and 2018, the German Ethics Council had 24 members in this period. On 28 May 2020, the council members elected medical ethicist Alena Buyx as its chair, and as its vice-chairs the lawyer Volker Lipp, the philosopher Julian Nida-Rümelin and the theoretical neuroscientist Susanne Schreiber.

- Prof. Dr. iur. Steffen Augsberg · University of Giessen
- Regional bishop Dr. theol. Petra Bahr · Evangelical-Lutheran Church of Hanover
- Prof. Dr. theol. Franz-Josef Bormann · University of Tübingen
- Prof. Dr. med. Alena Buyx · Technical University of Munich
- Prof. Dr. rer. nat. Hans-Ulrich Demuth · Fraunhofer Institute for Cell Therapy and Immunology (IZI) Leipzig
- Prof. Dr. iur. Helmut Frister · Heinrich Heine University Düsseldorf
- Prof. Dr. phil. habil. Dr. phil. h. c. lic. phil. Carl Friedrich Gethmann · University of Siegen (until 13 February 2021)
- Prof. Dr. theol. Elisabeth Gräb-Schmidt · University of Tübingen
- Prof. Dr. rer. nat. Dr. phil. Sigrid Graumann · Protestant University of Applied Sciences Rhineland-Westphalia-Lippe
- Prof. Dr. rer. nat. Armin Grunwald · Karlsruhe Institute of Technology (since 14 February 2021)
- Prof. Dr. med. Wolfram Henn · Saarland University
- Prof. Dr. rer. nat. Ursula Klingmüller · German Cancer Research Center
- Stephan Kruip · Mukoviszidose e.V. – German Cystic Fibrosis Association
- Prof. Dr. phil. Dr. h. c. Dipl.-Psych. Andreas Kruse · Heidelberg University (until 31 March 2022)
- Prof. Dr. iur. Dr. h. c. Volker Lipp · University of Göttingen
- Prof. Dr. theol. Andreas Lob-Hüdepohl · Catholic University of Applied Sciences Berlin
- Prof. Dr. phil. Dr. h. c. Julian Nida-Rümelin, Staatsminister a.D. · LMU Munich
- Prof. Dr. phil. habil. Annette Riedel · Esslingen University of Applied Sciences
- Prof. Dr. iur. Stephan Rixen · University of Bayreuth
- Prof. Dr. iur. Dr. phil. Frauke Rostalski · University of Cologne
- Prof. Dr. theol. Kerstin Schlögl-Flierl · University of Augsburg
- Prof. Dr. rer. nat. Susanne Schreiber · Humboldt University of Berlin
- Dr. med. Josef Schuster · Central Council of Jews in Germany
- Prof. Dr. phil. Mark Schweda · University of Oldenburg (since 10 June 2022)
- Prof. Dr. phil. Judith Simon · University of Hamburg
- Jun.-Prof. Dr. phil. Muna Tatari · Paderborn University

=== Members 2016–2020 ===
On 11 April 2016, the President of the Bundestag, Norbert Lammert, appointed the following members of the Ethics Council for the first or second time, respectively:

- Katrin Amunts, scholar in neuroscience and medicine (reappointed)
- Constanze Angerer, former president of the Regional Court Munich I (reappointed)
- Steffen Augsberg, legal scholar
- Franz-Josef Bormann, Catholic theologian
- Alena M. Buyx, scholar in ethics in medicine
- Dagmar Coester-Waltjen, legal scholar
- Peter Dabrock, Protestant theologian (reappointed)
- Christiane Fischer, general physician, director of the MEZIS (reappointed)
- Sigrid Graumann, human geneticist and scholar in ethics in medicine
- Wolfram Henn, human geneticist and scholar in ethics in medicine
- Wolfram Höfling, scholar in constitutional law (reappointed)
- İlhan Ilkılıç, physician and philosopher (reappointed)
- Ursula Klingenmüller, biologist
- Stephan Kruip, physicist, chairman of the association Mukoviszidose e.V.
- Andreas Kruse, psychologist and gerontologist
- Adelheid Kuhlmey, director of the Institute of Medical Sociology and Rehabilitation Science at the Charité Berlin
- Leo Latasch, physician, head of the emergency medical services of the city of Frankfurt (reappointed)
- Volker Lipp, legal scholar
- Andreas Lob-Hüdepohl, Catholic theologian
- Reinhard Merkel, criminal law expert and philosopher of law (reappointed)
- Gabriele Meyer, healthcare and nurse scientist (resigned from the Ethics Council at his own request on 30 June 2018)
- Elisabeth Steinhagen-Thiessen, physician, head of the research group geriatrics at the Charité Berlin (reappointed)
- Petra Thorn, social and family therapist
- Claudia Wiesemann, physician and scholar in ethics in medicine (reappointed)

The following scholars, whose appointment period had not yet expired in April 2016, were also members of the German Ethics Council in 2016:

- Carl Friedrich Gethmann, philosopher (member since 14 February 2013)
- Martin Hein, Protestant theologian, bishop of the Protestant church of Kurhessen-Waldeck (Resigned from the Council at the end of his term of appointment on 13 November 2018)

Changes since 2017:

- Carl Friedrich Gethmann was reappointed in February 2017 (the second term runs until 13 February 2021).
- Elisabeth Gräb-Schmidt, theologian, was appointed to the German Ethics Council with effect from 14 November 2018. She succeeds Martin Hein.
- Judith Simon was appointed to the German Ethics Council with effect from 1 July 2018. She succeeds Gabriele Meyer.

Chair and Vice-Chairs 2016–2020:
At the constituent meeting of the German Ethics Council on 28 April 2016, Peter Dabrock was elected chair of the council, Katrin Amunts, Andreas Kruse and Claudia Wiesemann Vice-Chairs. Following Andreas Kruse's resignation from the council at the end of April 2018, council member Volker Lipp was elected vice-chair at the plenary meeting on 17 May 2018.

=== Members 2012–2016 ===
On 11 April 2012, then President of the Bundestag Norbert Lammert appointed the following members for the German Ethics Council's second term:

- Katrin Amunts, neuroscientist
- Constanze Angerer, former President of the District Court of Munich I
- Wolf-Michael Catenhusen, former State Secretary of the Ministry of Education and Research (reappointed)
- Peter Dabrock, Protestant theologian
- Frank Emmrich, immunologist (reappointed)
- Christiane Fischer, general practitioner and medical managing director of MEZIS (German "No-Free-Lunch"-group)
- Carl Friedrich Gethmann, Professor of Philosophy (appointed in February 2013 as Heike Walles’ successor)
- Martin Hein, Protestant theologian and Bishop of the Protestant Church of Kurhessen-Waldeck (appointed in November 2014 as Wolfgang Huber's successor)
- Thomas Heinemann, philosopher and Professor of Medical Ethics
- Wolfram Höfling, Professor of Constitutional Law
- Wolfgang Huber, Protestant theologian, former Bishop of the diocese of Berlin-Brandenburg and former Chairman of the Council of the Protestant Church in Germany (official end of term in June 2014)
- İlhan Ilkılıç, physician and philosopher
- Leo Latasch, physician, Head of Frankfurt's Emergency Medical Service and Member of the Central Council of Jews in Germany
- Anton Losinger, Auxiliary Bishop in the diocese of Augsburg (reappointed)
- Reinhard Merkel, Professor of Criminal Law and Philosophy of Law
- Herbert Mertin, State Minister of Justice of Rhineland-Palatinate (retired)
- Eckhard Nagel, physician and Professor of Medical Management and Health Sciences (reappointed)
- Peter Radtke, author and actor (reappointed)
- Ulrike Riedel, lawyer (reappointed)
- Edzard Schmidt-Jortzig, former Federal Minister of Justice (reappointed)
- Eberhard Schockenhoff, Catholic theologian and former Vice Chairman of the German Ethics Council (reappointed)
- Elisabeth Steinhagen-Thiessen, physician and Head of the Research Group in Gerontology at the Charité, Berlin
- Jochen Taupitz, Professor of Law (reappointed)
- Silja Vöneky, Professor of International Law
- Heike Walles, Professor of Tissue Engineering and Regenerative Medicine (resigned in August 2012)
- Claudia Wiesemann, physician and medical ethicist
- Christiane Woopen, Professor of Ethics and Theory of Medicine (reappointed)
- Michael Wunder, certified psychologist and psychotherapist (reappointed)

During the constituting assembly, the German Ethics Council elected Christiane Woopen as chairwoman as well as Wolf-Michael Catenhusen, Peter Dabrock, and Jochen Taupitz as vice chairpersons.

=== Members 2008–2012 ===
Following the respective suggestions of the Bundestag and the Federal Government, the then President of the Bundestag Norbert Lammert appointed the following members on 15 February 2008, who represented the German Ethics Council until 2012:

- Hermann Barth, Protestant theologian and President of the Church Office of the Protestant Church in Germany (resigned in March 2010 at his own request)
- Axel W. Bauer, Professor of History, Theory and Ethics of Medicine
- Alfons Bora, sociologist and Professor of Technology Research
- Wolf-Michael Catenhusen, former State Secretary of the Ministry of Education and Research
- Stefanie Dimmeler, biologist and Professor of Molecular Cardiology
- Frank Emmrich, immunologist
- Volker Gerhardt, Professor of Philosophy
- Hildegund Holzheid, former President of the Bavarian Constitutional Court
- Wolfgang Huber, Protestant theologian, former Bishop of the diocese of Berlin-Brandenburg and former Chairman of the Council of the Protestant Church in Germany (appointed in June 2010)
- Christoph Kähler, Regional Bishop of the Protestant Church in Thuringia and Vice Chairman of the Council of the Protestant Church in Germany
- Regine Kollek, biotechnology expert
- Anton Losinger, Auxiliary Bishop in the diocese of Augsburg
- Weyma Lübbe, philosopher
- Eckhard Nagel, physician and Professor of Medical Management and Health Sciences
- Peter Radtke, author and actor
- Jens Reich, molecular biologist
- Ulrike Riedel, lawyer
- Edzard Schmidt-Jortzig, former Federal Minister of Justice
- Jürgen Schmude, former Federal Minister of Education and Research, former Federal Minister of Justice, former Federal Minister of the Interior, and former Praesides of the Synod of the Protestant Church in Germany
- Eberhard Schockenhoff, Catholic theologian
- Bettina Schöne-Seifert, Professor of Ethics in Medicine (resigned in March 2010 at her own request)
- Spiros Simitis, lawyer
- Jochen Taupitz, Professor of Law
- Erwin Teufel, former Minister President of Baden-Württemberg
- Heike Walles, Professor of Tissue Engineering and Regenerative Medicine (appointed in June 2010)
- Kristiane Weber-Hassemer, lawyer and former State Secretary
- Christiane Woopen, Professor of Ethics and Theory of Medicine
- Michael Wunder, psychologist and psychotherapist

During the German Ethics Council's inaugural meeting, its members elected Edzard Schmidt-Jortzig as their chairman and Christiane Woopen as well as Eberhard Schockenhoff as their vice chairpersons.

== Topics and opinions ==
The Council usually decides on its substantive focus during the last meeting of each year, creating a working schedule for the subsequent months. Each topic is continuously discussed in the plenary sessions, the working groups, and dedicated public events. The working process for an Opinion normally stretches over several years. If, in the drafting process, members have a dissenting view, they may express this in the Opinion. After publishing an opinion, the council accompanies the corresponding political and societal debates and evaluates the reception of its recommendations by the general public.

In addition to the Opinions, the Council publishes Ad hoc recommendations (for further information see the relevant paragraph below).

=== Anonymous relinquishment of infants ===
The council's first Opinion "Anonymous relinquishment of infants", published on 26 November 2009, addresses the ethical and legal problems raised by facilities for anonymous birth. Considering the legal and individual problems associated with the facilities for anonymous relinquishment of infants, and in view of the unproven life-protecting effect of these possibilities, the German Ethics Council recommends abandoning these facilities. Instead, public information and institutional aid programs for pregnant women should be expanded considerably.

=== Human biobanks for research ===
The Opinion "Human biobanks for research", published on 15 June 2010, discusses the ethical and legal issues arising in connection with human biobanks, ranging from the protection of individual rights to the global regulation of research infrastructures. In its Opinion, the Council proposes a five-pillar concept for biobank regulation. It includes recommendations on introducing biobank secrecy, on defining permissible use, on involving ethics commissions, on quality assurance and on transparency. It is the aim of the recommendation to provide a suitable legal framework for the interests and rights of personality of the donors, to achieve more legal certainty for biobank research and at the same time to facilitate research.

=== Medical benefits and costs in healthcare ===
The council's Opinion "Medical benefits and costs in healthcare", published on 27 January 2011, deals with the question of the allocation of funds in the health care sector. Addressing this issue was a reaction to the inability of two Enquete Commissions appointed by the Bundestag to pass recommendations concerning this matter. Considering the impending cost increase in the health care sector, due to medical progress with a simultaneous increase in life expectancy, the council's Opinion formulates recommendations based on the principle of human dignity and the accompanying fundamental rights that aim both at optimising the allocation of funds for healthcare and achieving equitable distribution of resources.

=== Preimplantation genetic diagnosis ===
In this Opinion, published on 8 March 2011, the council comprehensively sets out the relevant factual position and the decisive arguments of supporters and opponents of permitting preimplantation genetic diagnosis (PGD). Against the background of current technological and legal developments, the Ethics Council describes the current practice and the new possibilities of genetic diagnosis of embryos. It goes into detail on the various positions and arguments on the status and protection of embryos and discusses the most important socio-ethical aspects. Due to differing views among the council's members, particularly concerning the status of embryos in vitro and thus the justifiability of PGD, the council develops two alternative proposals for legislation on PGD.

=== Human-animal mixtures in research ===
In its Opinion "Human-animal mixtures in research", published on 27 September 2011, the Council identifies the ethical challenges that arise from the creation of human-animal mixtures for medical research purposes. Such experiments call into question the biological species boundary between humans and animals. The Council considers it necessary to identify the ethical challenges that may be presented by the creation of human-animal mixtures and to determine where it may be appropriate to set binding limits. The Council concentrates its attention on the transfer of human material to animals, which it examines on the basis of three examples: cytoplasmic hybrids (cybrids), formed by the insertion of a human cell nucleus into an enucleated animal egg; transgenic animals with human genetic material; and the transfer of human cells into the brains of fetal or adult animals (brain chimeras). The Opinion presents recommendations on these examples.

=== Intersexuality ===
Upon request of the Federal Government, the Council dedicated its prepared the Opinion "Intersexuality", published on 23 February 2012, to the situation of intersex people in Germany. It emphasizes that people with differences of sex development (DSD) deserve respect and support; this implies that they need to be protected from undesirable medical developments, i.e. discrimination. The central issue in question concerns the admissibility of surgical procedures on sexual organs of people with DSD. If a person's physical integrity requires an irreversible medical sex disambiguation or sex assignment measure, the relevant decision should always be taken solely by the individual concerned. In the case of a minor, such measures should be adopted only if absolutely necessary for safeguarding the child's well-being and only after thorough consideration of all their medical, psychological and psychosocial advantages, disadvantages and long-term consequences. The Opinion further recommends that the compulsory binary classification of "male" and "female" in the civil registry should be ceased and non-binary people should be enabled to have registered civil partnerships.

=== Dementia and self-determination ===
The council's Opinion "Dementia and self-determination", published on 24 April 2012, emphasizes the importance of respecting and encouraging the self-determination of people with dementia. It supports the federal government's aim of developing a National Action Plan for dementia. The need for care of people with dementia should be reviewed by taking adequate account of their potential of self-determination. Outpatient communal housing and residential communities for persons with dementia should be expanded and the effort of caring family members more widely recognized as well as financially supported. The principles of the UN Convention on the Rights of Persons with Disabilities, which also includes persons with dementia, should be consistently applied to support their possibilities of self-determination.

=== Biosecurity ===
The Opinion on "Biosecurity – freedom and responsibility of research", published on 7 May 2014, discusses the issue of Dual Use Research of Concern (DURC), which describes research results in the life sciences that cannot only be used for the benefit of individuals and society, but also misused with the intent to cause harm. To prevent such misuse, the Council recommends heightening the scientific community's awareness of the danger of misuse, establishing a national biosecurity code of conduct to deal responsibly with research that may be open to misuse, and making funding of DURC contingent on approval by a new DURC Commission. Further, the Council recommends legally binding regulations and calls upon the scientific community and the federal government to promote the development of biosecurity codes of conduct for responsible research both within the EU and at a global level.

=== Incest prohibition ===
The Opinion on "Incest prohibition", published 24 September 2014, evaluates, if, based on ethical reasons, a revision of the current legal situation on the grounds of ethics is advisable. The Council aims for an open and unprejudiced discussion of the juridical and ethical issues arising in the context of close-relative relationships, focusing on consensual coitus between adults. Particular attention is given the case of sexual contact between (half) siblings that share a family unit and bonds lived in practice no longer exist – a possible aftermath of a divorce or sperm donation for example. The evaluation is based on the weighing between clashing fundamental values, particularly how the right of sexual autonomy relates to the obligation to protect family structures. Concerning this matter, the council could not find an unambiguous consensus: the majority would weigh the fundamental right of sexual autonomy higher, while the minority sees the protection of family as an entity as a priority and wants to uphold the prohibition of incest.

=== Brain death and decision on organ donation ===
An Opinion, published 24 February 2015, addresses the ethical and legal aspects concerning brain death and their implications regarding organ donation. Particularly, it deals with the questions whether brain death is a convincing criterion for a person's death and whether brain death should be considered as a sufficient condition for the ethical and constitutional legitimacy of organ removal. The Council emphasizes the importance of transparency as well as an open public discussion in order to strengthen confidence in transplantation medicine. Further, it calls for improvements in information and communication and suggests amendments to the statutory regulations on organ-protective measures.

=== Embryo donation, embryo adoption, and parental responsibility ===
In an Opinion, published 22 March 2016, the Council presents recommendations regarding the legal regulation of embryo donation, embryo adoption and assumption of parental responsibility. The Council discusses the questions arising from the transfer of so-called surplus embryos to a third party for the purpose of carrying them out and assuming permanent parental responsibility. Namely it addresses the questions of children's opportunities for life and development, parental responsibility, and family relationships. Taking special account of the child's welfare, the Council considers it to be ethically necessary to legally specify the framework conditions of embryo donation and adoption. The Opinion contains several recommendations on how to deal with both.

=== Patient welfare as an ethical standard for hospital care ===
Growing economic pressure due to the cost development in the health care sector poses the question of the guiding normative criterion of hospital care. Addressing this issue, the Opinion, published 5 April 2016, identifies patient welfare as the guiding ethical principle for hospitals. It examines three dimensions determining patient welfare: patients’ self-determination, treatment quality, and distributive justice. The Council formulates recommendations that aim to enshrine and guarantee the orientation on patient welfare in hospital care, including for instance improvements in the areas of communication, documentation, digitalization, and accessibility.

=== Big data and health ===
The Opinion "Big data and health", published 30 November 2017, examines the effects of big data processing on the healthcare system. Big data processing is characterized by the large volume and variety of data as well as the high velocity of its collection and processing,. Big data can improve diagnosis, therapy, and prevention; however, risks such as a loss of control over personal data arise. The Council examined these trends in a two-and-a-half year long process that involved extensive exchanges with experts and interested members of the public. The Opinion analyses the chances and risks of big data in five health relevant application contexts, evaluates the current legal framework and explores how values such as freedom, privacy, sovereignty, beneficence, justice, solidarity and responsibility can be guaranteed under big data conditions. The Council recommends a governance concept focusing on data sovereignty and makes specific suggestions to (i) realise the potentials of big data, (ii) preserve individual freedom and privacy, (iii) safeguard fairness and solidarity, and (iv) promote responsibility and trust.

=== Benevolent coercion ===
In this Opinion, published 1 November 2018, the Council addresses the use of coercive measures in health and social services, including for instance the deprivation of liberty and medical treatment or care measures against a person's will. If a person threatens to seriously harm themself, coercive measures can serve a person's welfare. Nevertheless, every instance of such "benevolent coercion" represents a serious infringement of the fundamental rights of the person concerned and is therefore in particular need of legal and ethical justification. Firstly, the Opinion is intended to raise public awareness of the problems and complexities around benevolent coercion. Secondly, it aims to draw the attention of politicians, legislators and practitioners to regulatory and implementation deficits and it formulates recommendations to remedy them. Thirdly, it intends to support the health and social professions in reorienting their self-image and their practice. The Opinion contains general recommendations for the responsible handling of coercion in professional caring relationships, as well as specific advice for psychiatry, child and youth support services, and the fields of elderly and disability care.

=== Vaccination as a Duty? ===
Using the example of measles, the council has examined which regulatory measures are ethically and legally acceptable to meet vaccination goals. In its Opinion, published 27 June 2019, the Council states that it is not a purely private matter, but rather a moral duty to have oneself and one's own children vaccinated against a highly contagious infectious disease such as measles. However, the existence of this moral duty does not necessarily entail the justification of a legal obligation to vaccinate. At the time of publication of its Opinion, the Council considers such a mandatory vaccination policy only to be appropriate for personnel in the health, social and educational sectors. However, the Council recommends a number of other measures, which, taken together, could be suitable to close any remaining vaccination gaps and achieve the goal of eliminating measles permanently.

=== Intervening in the Human Germline ===
In its Opinion, published 9 May 2019, the Council examines whether interventions in the human germline could be at all justifiable and according to which criteria the ethical admissibility of specific applications can be decided. It examines the further research process necessary before any clinical application and three possible areas of application for germline interventions: the prevention of severe hereditary disorders, the reduction of disease risks and the targeted improvement of specific human traits or abilities (enhancement). The analysis is based on eight ethical concepts: human dignity, protection of life and integrity, freedom, naturalness, non-maleficence and beneficence, justice, solidarity and responsibility. The Council members come up with seven unanimous recommendations, including a call for an application moratorium, but also the agreement that the human germline is not categorically inviolable. On many issues, however, there are different positions.

=== Robotics for Good Care ===
The research and development of robotic systems for home and in-patient care has received considerable public funding over the last couple of years. Political justification for this policy derives from urgent infrastructural, personnel and financial problems resulting from the increasing number of people in need of care and assistance and the worsening shortage of nursing staff. In its Opinion "Robotics for Good Care", published 10 March 2020, the Council acknowledges the potential benefits of robotics for the entire care sector, but sees these benefits less in the elimination of staff shortages or the nursing crisis and more in its potential to promote good care. The realization of this potential, however, requires that the use of robots does not replace interpersonal relationships, that it is not used against the will of (professional) caregivers and people in need of care or merely to maximize efficiency, and that those affected by the techniques can also participate in their development.

=== "Reasonable" Treatment of Animals ===
The Council took current debates as an opportunity to critically evaluate the treatment of livestock from a legal and ethical perspective. A working group looked at differences and discrepancies in dealing with and relating to different animals as well as at the obvious tensions between animal welfare regulations and certain aspects of agricultural practice. The aim of the project was to define more clearly both the protected goods at the heart of animal welfare regulation and the criteria according to which these may be curtailed in favour of other interests. Furthermore, the group aimed to examine ways in which such a balancing of interests could be done more honestly and consistently in the future. On 16 June 2020, the Council published its Opinion "Tierwohlachtung – Zum verantwortlichen Umgang mit Nutztieren" (Respecting Animal Welfare − On the Responsible Treatment of Farm Animals). An English version of the Opinion is announced.

=== Immunity Certificates during the Covid-19 Pandemic ===
The COVID-19 pandemic has triggered controversial discussions about the introduction of state-controlled immunity certificates. Relating to legislative decisions on the COVID-19 pandemic, the Federal Minister of Health has asked the German Ethics Council to consider the ethical requirements and implications associated with such certificates. In its Opinion, the German Ethics Council makes a number of joint recommendations on the topic and develops different positions on whether and − if so − under which conditions immunity certificates can be recommended. The Opinion "Immunity Certificates during the Covid-19 Pandemic" has been published on 22 September 2020.

=== Vulnerability and Resilience in a Crisis – Ethical Criteria for Decision-Making in a Pandemic ===
The German version of the Opinion "Vulnerability and Resilience in a Crisis – Ethical Criteria for Decision-Making in a Pandemic" has been published on 4 April 2022. In this Opinion, the German Ethics Council reflects on the experience gathered in the struggle against the COVID-19 pandemic and draws conclusions for future ways to deal with a pandemic. The Council develops important ethical criteria for complex decisions and presents recommendations for weighing goods in the context of pandemics.

=== Suicide – Responsibility, Prevention and Autonomy ===
The German version of the Opinion "Suicide – Responsibility, Prevention and Autonomy" has been published on 22 September 2022. The German Ethics Council illustrates the scope and complexity of phenomena related to suicidality, defines more precisely preconditions for fully autonomous suicide decisions, and highlights the different responsibilities of various stakeholders in the context of suicide decisions and suicide prevention.

=== Humans and Machines – Challenges of Artificial Intelligence ===
The German version of the Opinion "Humans and Machines – Challenges of Artificial Intelligence" has been published on 20 March 2023. The Council examines how digital technologies, and in particular artificial intelligence, affect human self-conception and interactions. In the view of the Ethics Council, the key question for an ethical evaluation is whether human authorship and the conditions for responsible action are expanded or diminished by the use of AI. In the Opinion, the Council addresses this question in four exemplary areas – medicine, schools, public communication and the shaping of public opinion, and public administration.

=== Climate Justice ===
The German version of the Opinion "Climate Justice" has been published on 13 March 2024. In it the German Ethics Council develops a concept of climate justice: Burdens and duties in the fight against climate change should be distributed in such a way that the minimum requirements for a good, successful life can be achieved for all human beings now and in the future. On this basis, the Ethics Council addresses key issues regarding responsibility in climate change and formulates recommendations.

=== Normality as a process ===
The German version of the Impulse Paper "Normality as a process" has been published on 16 October 2024. In this Impulse Paper the German Ethics Council examines how ideas about what is normal exert normative effects in many areas of society. One important starting point of this enquiry is the finding that neither what is considered normal nor, in contrast, what appears to be abnormal, deviant or conspicuous is simply “given”. Sometimes, processes of normalisation evolve gradually and imperceptibly; in other cases, open revolt against certain ideas of normality is the aim of political campaigns.

== Ad hoc Recommendations ==
Since 2013, the council has been publishing Ad hoc Recommendations in which it comments on current issues.

Ad hoc Recommendations have been published concerning the following topics:

- Stem cell research – new challenges for the ban on cloning and treatment of artificially created germ cells? (published 2014)
- The regulation of assisted suicide in an open society: German Ethics Council recommends the statutory reinforcement of suicide prevention (published 2014)
- Suicide prevention instead of suicide support. Reminder of a demand by the German Ethics Council on the occasion of a decision by the Federal Administrative Court (published 2017)
- Germline intervention in the human embryo: German Ethics Council calls for global political debate and international regulation (published 2017)
- The Challenges of Providing Care for Rare Diseases (published 2018)
- Transgender Identity in Children and Adolescents: Therapeutic Controversies – Ethical Orientation (published 2020)
- Joint Statement on the Ethics of Heritable Human Genome Editing (joint statement of the Ethics Councils of Germany, France and the United Kingdom, published 2020)
- Solidarity and Responsibility during the Coronavirus Crisis (published 2020)
- How should access to a COVID-19 vaccine be regulated? Joint position paper by STIKO, German Ethics Council and Leopoldina (published 2020)
- A Modicum of Social Contact in Long-term Care during the COVID-19 Pandemic (published 2020)
- Special Rules for Vaccinated People? (published 2021)
- On Mandatory Vaccination against COVID-19 for Employees with a Particular Professional Responsibility (published 2021)
- Ethical Orientation on the Issue of General Mandatory Vaccination (published 2021)
- Pandemic and Mental Health. Attention, Assistance and Support for Children, Adolescents and Young Adults in and after Societal Crises (published 2022)

== Other publications ==
In addition to the Opinions and Ad hoc Recommendations, the Council publishes annual reports, three times a year an "information letter" (Infobrief, only in German), studies and documentations (in German, sometimes also in English), e.g. conference reports, documentations of consultations.

== International exchange ==
The Council stays in close dialogue with its partner committees in other European countries. For example, trilateral meetings with the British Nuffield Council on Bioethics and the French Comité consultatif national d’éthique took place in Berlin in 2009, 2012, 2016 and 2019. Meetings of the Ethics Councils of Germany, Austria and Switzerland were held in Berlin in 2014, 2017 ans 2022.

In addition, the Council hosted the 2016 Global Summit of National Ethics/Bioethics Councils in Berlin under the Presidency of 2012-2016 Chair Prof. Dr. Christiane Woopen of Cologne University.

In November 2020, the European Commission and the German Ethics Council organised the 26th Forum of National Ethics Councils (NEC) and the European Group on Ethics in Science and New Technologies (EGE). The forum focused on ethical issues concerning artificial intelligence, germline intervention and dealing with the Corona pandemic. An event of the series "Bioethics Forum" on the question of vaccines distribution in the context of the corona pandemic was part of the programme.
