= Gerhard Zeitel =

- Born: 25 November 1927; Rostock, Mecklenburg-Vorpommern, Germany
- Died: 26 January 1991 (aged 63)
- Education: Free University of Berlin
- Scientific career
- Fields: Economics
- Workplaces: University of Tübingen, University of Mannheim

Gerhard Friedrich Hermann Zeitel (born 1927 in Rostock, Mecklenburg-Vorpommern, Germany, died 26 January 1991) was a German researcher, economist and former professor for Economics and Statistics at the University of Mannheim from 1972 to 1989. Moreover, he served as rector of the University of Mannheim between 1970 and 1973.

== Education ==
Zeitel studied from 1948 to 1951 economics and business administration at the Free University of Berlin where he obtained his Diplom-Kaufmann (former German master's equivalent) in 1951. From 1952 onwards he worked as research assistant at the FU Berlin and completed his Ph.D. in business administration in 1955. Afterwards, he habilitated from 1955 to 1960 at the University of Tübingen.

== Academics ==
He worked from 1962 to 1972 as chaired professor for Statistics and Economics at the University of Mannheim. At the University of Mannheim his research focused primarily on financial, fiscal and economic policies as well as credit and capital politics. In 1970 Zeitel became president of the university and was succeeded by Eduard Gaugler in his role as rector of the university in 1973. From 1975 until 1982 Zeitel served as president of the Bundesverbands Deutscher Volks- und Betriebswirte (bdvb) (German Association of Economists).

== Publications ==
- Zeitel, Gerhard. Die Steuerlastverteilung in der Bundesrepublik Deutschland. Mohr, Tübingen 1960.
- Zeitel, Gerhard. Gutachten über die Methodenwahl zur Durchführung eines Vergleichs der effektiven Steuerlast von Unternehmen in den Mitgliedstaaten der EWG (= Studien. Reihe Wettbewerb. Bd. 7, ZDB-ID 518230-x). Kommission der Europäischen Gemeinschaften, Brüssel 1968.

== Bibliography ==
- Rudolf Vierhaus, Ludolf Herbst (ed.): Biographisches Handbuch der Mitglieder des Deutschen Bundestages. 1949–2002. Band 2: N–Z. Anhang. Saur, Munich 2002, ISBN 3-598-23782-0, p. 984.

== See also ==
- Mannheim
- List of University of Mannheim people
- University of Mannheim
- University of Tübingen
