= Wolfgang Franz =

Wolfgang Franz may refer to:

- Wolfgang Franz (economist)
- Wolfgang Franz (mathematician)
