= Alena Buyx =

German medicine ethicist and university teacher

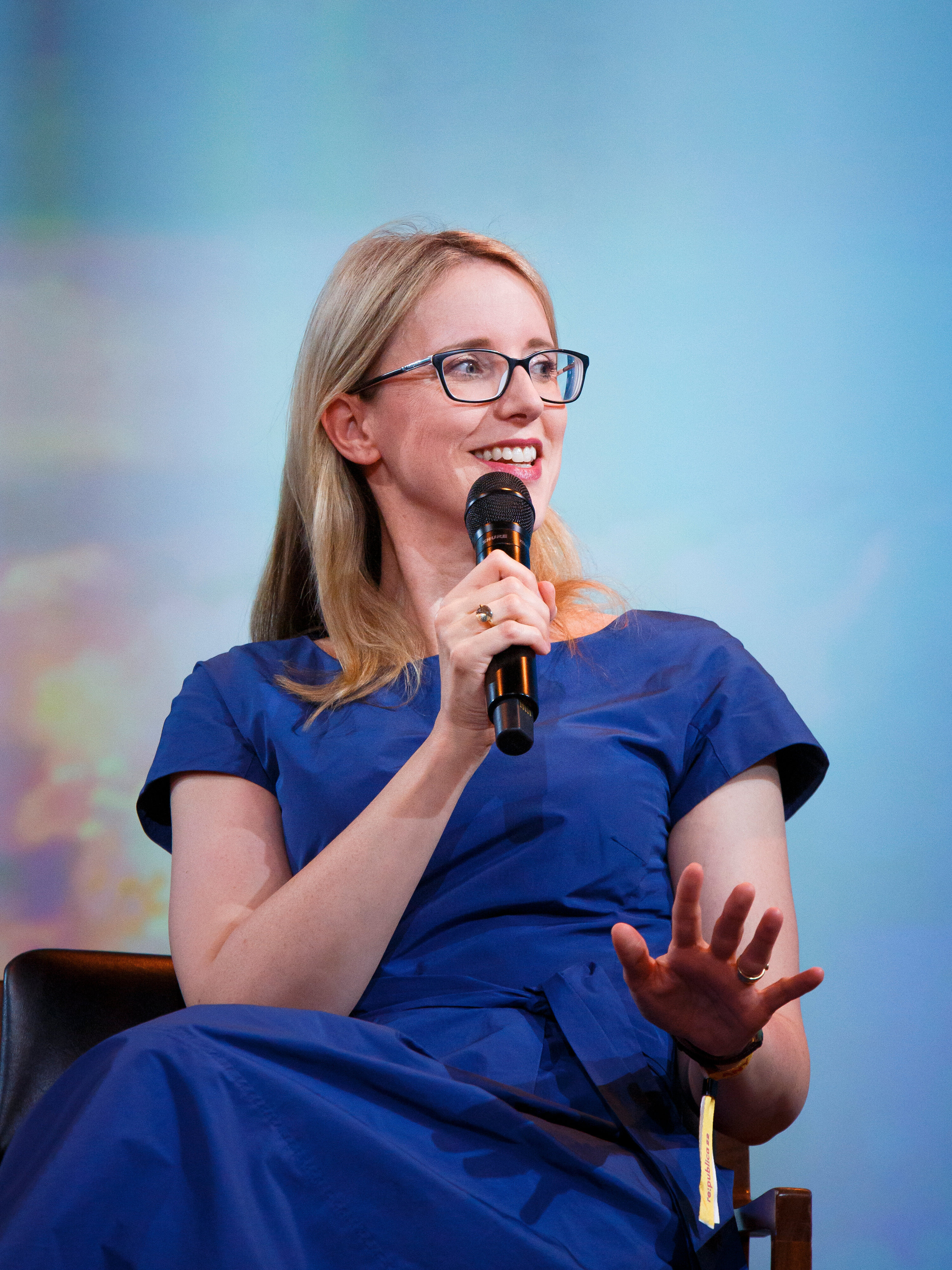
- Buyx at re:publica in 2022
- Born: 29 September 1977 (age 48)
- Education: University of Münster (MA), (MD), (Hab.); University of York; University College London
- Scientific career
- Fields: Medical ethics
- Workplaces: University of Kiel; Technical University of Munich

Alena Michaela Buyx (German pronunciation: ['aleːna mɪçaˈʔeːla ˈbʏks]; born 29 September 1977 in Osnabrück) is a German medical ethicist and professor. She was the chair of the German Ethics Council from 2020 until April 2024.

== Early life and education ==
Buyx attended the Johannes-Kepler-Gymnasium in Ibbenbüren. From 1997, she studied medicine, philosophy, sociology and health sciences at the University of Münster, the University of York (UK), and University College London, supported by a scholarship from the Studienstiftung des deutschen Volkes (German Academic Scholarship Foundation). In 2005, she received her medical doctorate (Dr. med.), obtained her medical license (Approbation), and earned a Magister Artium degree in philosophy and sociology from the University of Münster.

== Academic career ==
From 2006 to 2008, she worked as a research associate at the Institute for Ethics, History and Theory of Medicine at the University of Münster. In 2008/09, she was an academic scholar at the Harvard University Program in Ethics and Health at Harvard Medical School. From 2009 to 2012, she served as assistant director of the Nuffield Council on Bioethics in London.

She completed her habilitation in Münster in 2013, receiving the venia legendi (teaching qualification) in ethics, history and theory of medicine. From 2012 to 2014, she headed the DFG-Emmy Noether Group "Bioethics and Political Philosophy" at the University of Münster and was a senior research fellow in Public Policy at University College London until 2015.

In 2014, the Christian-Albrechts-Universität zu Kiel appointed Buyx as Professor of Medical Ethics. She simultaneously served as co-director of the Institute for Experimental Medicine at the University of Kiel. In 2016, she was appointed as a member of the German Ethics Council and became its chair in 2020.

In September 2018, she accepted the call from the Technical University of Munich (TUM) to the W3 professorship for Ethics in Medicine and Health Technologies. She is director of the Institute for the History and Ethics of Medicine at TUM. In 2020, she was elected to the German National Academy of Sciences Leopoldina in the philosophy of science section and the acatech (German Academy of Science and Engineering).

== Positions and Memberships ==
=== Current Positions ===
- Since 2025: Member of the German Science Council (Wissenschaftsrat)
- Since 2024: Member of the Board of Trustees of the Bertelsmann Foundation
- Since 2024: Member of the Supervisory Board of Charité – Universitätsmedizin Berlin
- Since 2023: Member of the Board of Trustees of the ZEIT Foundation Bucerius and Bucerius Law School
- Since 2023: Member of the Board of Trustees of the Max Planck Institute for Biological Intelligence
- Since 2021: Member of the Board of Trustees of the Free University of Berlin
- Since 2021: Member of acatech – German Academy of Science and Engineering
- Since 2020: Member of the German National Academy of Sciences Leopoldina
- Since 2018: Co-Director (non-executive) of the Centre for the Study of Contemporary Solidarity at the University of Vienna

=== Recent Positions ===
- Until 2025: Member of the Expert Council "Health and Resilience" of the German Federal Government
- Until 2025: Member of the Scientific Advisory Board of the Federal Office of Civil Protection and Disaster Assistance
- 2023-2024: Member of the Scientific Advisory Board for the Science Year "Freedom" of the Federal Ministry of Education and Research
- 2022-2024: Member of the Jury of the Georg von Holtzbrinck Prize for Science Journalism
- 2021-2024: Member of the Scientific Advisory Board of the Robert Koch Institute
- 2021-2023: Member of the Corona Expert Council of the Federal Government to Combat the COVID-19 pandemic
- 2020-2024: Chair of the German Ethics Council
- 2020-2024: Member of the Bavarian AI Council
- 2019-2021: Member of the WHO Expert Advisory Committee on Developing Global Standards for Governance and Oversight of Human Genome Editing
- 2016-2024: Member of the German Ethics Council
- 2013-2016: Member of the Central Ethics Committee at the German Medical Association (ZEKO)

== Awards and Honors (Selection) ==
- 2025: Ernst Ludwig Winnacker Prize of the Bayer Foundation
- 2024: Order of Merit of the Federal Republic of Germany (Bundesverdienstkreuz am Bande)
- 2023: Bavarian Order of Merit
- 2022: Bavarian Order of the Constitution
- 2021: German National Prize "for her commitment to social cohesion during the Corona crisis"
- 2021: Heinz Maier Leibnitz Medal of the Technical University of Munich
- 2021: Thieme Manager of the Year Award
- 2021: "40 over 40 – Germany's Most Inspiring Women"
- 2015: Teaching Award of the Medical Faculty of the University of Kiel
- 2010: Visiting Fellowship of the Fondation Brocher
- 2008/09: Visiting Fellowship of Harvard Medical School
- 2007: Young Scholar Award of the European Association for Philosophy of Medicine and Health Care
- 2005: Young Investigator Award of the Academy for Ethics in Medicine
- 2001/02: Hölderlin Scholarship of the Alfried Krupp von Bohlen und Halbach Foundation
- 1997-2004: Scholarship of the German Academic Scholarship Foundation (Studienstiftung des deutschen Volkes)

== Public Engagement ==
Buyx is committed to science communication and public engagement. Since August 2025, she has been co-moderator (alternating with journalist Stephanie Rohde) of the science discussion program "Nano Talk" on 3sat, the successor format to the interdisciplinary discussion program "Scobel". In 2025, her book Leben und Sterben: Die großen Fragen ethisch entscheiden (Life and Death: Making Ethical Decisions on the Big Questions) became a Spiegel bestseller.

She regularly gives public lectures on various medical ethics topics and appears in television and other media. She is committed to communicating with the public and making ethical considerations accessible to a broad audience.

== Reception ==
As Chair of the German Ethics Council from 2020 to 2024, Buyx played a prominent role during the COVID-19 pandemic. The Ethics Council issued several statements and recommendations on ethical aspects of pandemic management, including on vaccination priorities, solidarity and responsibility, and the protection of vulnerable groups. During this time, she also served on the Federal Government's Corona Expert Council from December 2021 to April 2023.

== Personal life ==
Buyx is married to Austrian entrepreneur Josef Lentsch, CEO of the Political Tech Summit, and has two sons.

In April 2023, Buyx was one of the 22 personal guests at the ceremony in which former chancellor Angela Merkel was decorated with the Grand Cross of the Order of Merit for special achievement by President Frank-Walter Steinmeier at Schloss Bellevue in Berlin.

== Selected publications ==
Books

- Buyx, A. (2025). Leben und Sterben: Die großen Fragen ethisch entscheiden. S. Fischer Verlag. (Spiegel Bestseller)
- Prainsack, B., & Buyx, A. (2017). Solidarity in Biomedicine and Beyond. Cambridge University Press.
- Prainsack, B., & Buyx, A. (2016). Das Solidaritätsprinzip: Plädoyer für eine Renaissance in Medizin und Bioethik. Campus Verlag.
- Prainsack, B., & Buyx, A. (2011). Solidarity: Reflections on an Emerging Concept in Bioethics. Nuffield Council on Bioethics.

Selected Journal Articles

- Willem, T., Fritzsche, M.C., Zimmermann, B.M., et al., & Buyx, A. (2024). Embedded Ethics in Practice: A Toolbox for Integrating the Analysis of Ethical and Social Issues into Healthcare AI Research. Science and Engineering Ethics, 31(1):3.
- Lekadir, K., Frangi, A.F., Porras, A.R., et al., & Buyx, A. (2024). FUTURE-AI: International Consensus Guideline for Trustworthy and Deployable Artificial Intelligence in Healthcare. British Medical Journal, 388:e081554.
- Bak, M., Madai, V.I., Celi, L.A., et al., & Buyx, A. (2024). Federated Learning is Not a Cure-all for Data Ethics. Nature Machine Intelligence.
- Fiske, A., McLennan, S., & Buyx, A. (2022). Ethical Insights from the COVID-19 Pandemic in Germany. The Lancet Regional Health Europe, 9:100213.
- McLennan, S., Fiske, A., Tigard, D., Müller, R., Haddadin, S., & Buyx, A. (2022). Embedded Ethics: A Proposal for Integrating Ethics into the Development of Medical AI. BMC Medical Ethics, 23:6.
- Meier, L.J., Hein, A., Diepold, K., & Buyx, A. (2022). Algorithms for Ethical Decision-Making in the Clinic: A Proof of Concept. The American Journal of Bioethics, 22(7):4–20.
- McLennan, S., Fiske, A., Celi, L., Müller, R., Harder, J., Ritt, K., Haddadin, S., & Buyx, A. (2020). Embedded Ethics: A Proposal for Integrating Ethics into the Development of Healthcare AI. Nature Machine Intelligence, 2:488–490.
- Fiske, A., Henningsen, P., & Buyx, A. (2019). Your Robot Therapist Will See You Now: Ethical Implications of Embodied Artificial Intelligence in Psychiatry, Psychology, and Psychotherapy. Journal of Medical Internet Research, 21(5):e13216.
- Sierawska, A., & Buyx, A. (2019). Unmet Needs in Children with ADHD – Can tDCS Fill the Gap? Promises and Ethical Challenges. Frontiers in Psychiatry. doi:10.3389/fpsyt.2019.00334.
- Richter, G., Borzikowsky, C., Lieb, W., Schreiber, S., Krawczak, M., & Buyx, A. (2019). Patient Views on Research Use of Clinical Data Without Consent: Legal, but Also Acceptable? European Journal of Human Genetics. doi:10.1038/s41431-019-0340-6.
- Prainsack, B., & Buyx, A. (2018). The Value of Work and Labour: Addressing the Future of Work Through the Lens of Solidarity. Bioethics, 32(9):585–592.
- Fiske, A., Buyx, A., & Prainsack, B. (2018). Health Information Counselors: A New Profession for the Age of Big Data? Academic Medicine. doi:10.1097/ACM.0000000000002395.
- Richter, G., Krawczak, M., Lieb, W., Wolff, L., Schreiber, S., & Buyx, A. (2018). Broad Consent for Healthcare-Embedded Biobanking: Understanding and Reasons to Donate in a Large Patient Sample. Genetics in Medicine, 20(1):76–82.
- Littmann, J., Rid, A., & Buyx, A. (2018). Tackling Antimicrobial Resistance: Ethical Framework for Rational Antibiotic Use. European Journal of Public Health, 28(2):359–363.
- Prainsack, B., & Buyx, A. (2012). Solidarity in Contemporary Bioethics – Towards a New Approach. Bioethics, 26(7):343–350.
