= Heinz König =

- Born: 25 December 1927; Montabaur, Rhineland-Palatinate, Germany
- Died: 21 November 2002 (aged 74)
- Education: University of Mainz; University of Münster
- Awards: Merit Cross 1st Class, the Golden University Medal of the University of Mannheim, Fellowship of the Econometric Society, honorary doctorate of the University of Tübingen
- Scientific career
- Fields: Econometrics
- Workplaces: University of Mannheim; Stanford University; Harvard University
- Doctoral advisor: Louis Zimmerman
- Doctoral students: Jürgen Wolters

Heinz König (25 December 1927 – 21 November 2002) was a German researcher, economist and former professor for Economy and Econometrics at the University of Mannheim from 1962 to 1996. Moreover, he served as President (Rektor) of the University of Mannheim between 1979 and 1982. In addition, König was founding director of the Zentrum für Europäische Wirtschaftsforschung (ZEW).

== Education ==
He studied from 1948 to 1951 economics and business administration at the University of Mainz where he obtained his Diplom-Volkswirt (former German master's equivalent) in 1951. Afterwards, he obtained his PhD in Economy/Econometrics at the same university in 1953—in his dissertation König concentrated on the Circular flow of income and Input–output model (Original Title: Wirtschaftskreislaufmodelle und die Methode der Input-Output-Analyse). König worked as research assistant at the Institute for Economics and Social Sciences of the University of Münster where he completed his habilitation in 1958. Between 1958/1959 he was Rockefeller Fellow at the Massachusetts Institute of Technology (MIT), Harvard University and Stanford University.

== Academics ==
He worked from 1962 until his retirement in 1996 as chaired professor at the University of Mannheim. Over the years of his academic work, he received several other proposals from Ruhr University Bochum (1964), the University of Münster (1966), the University of Zurich (1966 and 1971), the University of Bonn (1970), LMU Munich (1971), and Vienna University of Economics and Business (1974) which he turned down. From 1991 to 1998, König served as director of the Institute für Mittelstandsforschung (Institute for Small- and Medium Sized Companies) at the University of Mannheim, where he conducted research on the German Mittelstand. Moreover, König was visiting professor at the University of Basel (1963), the Northwestern University (1979–1982) and the University of Pennsylvania (1983). He became emeritus at the University of Mannheim in 1996. König co-founded the ZEW in 1991 and served as its first director until 1997.

== Heinz König Young Scholar Award ==
The Heinz König Young Scholar Award is named after ZEW's late founding director Heinz König. It awards excellent empirical papers by young researchers. Every year, the Heinz König Young Scholar Award is given to the author of the best paper presented at the end of the annual ZEW Summer Workshop. The price is endowed with €5,000.

== Selected publications ==
- Franz, Wolfgang; ——— (1990). "A Disequilibrium Approach to Unemployment in the Federal Republic of Germany". European Economic Review. 34 (2–3): 413–422. doi:10.1016/0014-2921(90)90114-E.
- Franz, Wolfgang; Entorf, H.; ———; Smolny, W. (1990). "The Development of German Employment and Unemployment: Estimation and Simulation of a Disequilibrium Macro Model". In Drèze, J.; Bean, C. (eds.). Europe's Unemployment Problem. Cambridge: MIT Press. pp. 239–287. ISBN 0-262-04111-1.
- Franz, Wolfgang; ——— (1986). "The Nature and Causes of Unemployment in the Federal Republic of Germany since the Seventies: An Empirical Investigation". Economica. 53 (Supplement): 219–244. doi:10.2307/2554380. JSTOR 2554380.
- ———; Laisney, Francois; Lechner, M.; Pohlmeier, W. (1995). "Do Married Women Base Their Labour Supply Decisions on Gross or Marginal Wages?". Kyklos. 48: 347–368. doi:10.1111/j.1467-6435.1995.tb02319.x.
- ———; Laisney, Francois; Lechner, M.; Pohlmeier, W. (1994). "On the Dynamics of Process Innovative Activity: An Empirical Investigation using Panel Data". In Oppenländer, K. H.; Poser, G. (eds.). The Explanatory Power of Business Cycle Surveys. Aldershot: Avebury. pp. 243–262. ISBN 1-85628-575-8.

== See also ==
- List of University of Mannheim people
