= Review of International Organizations =

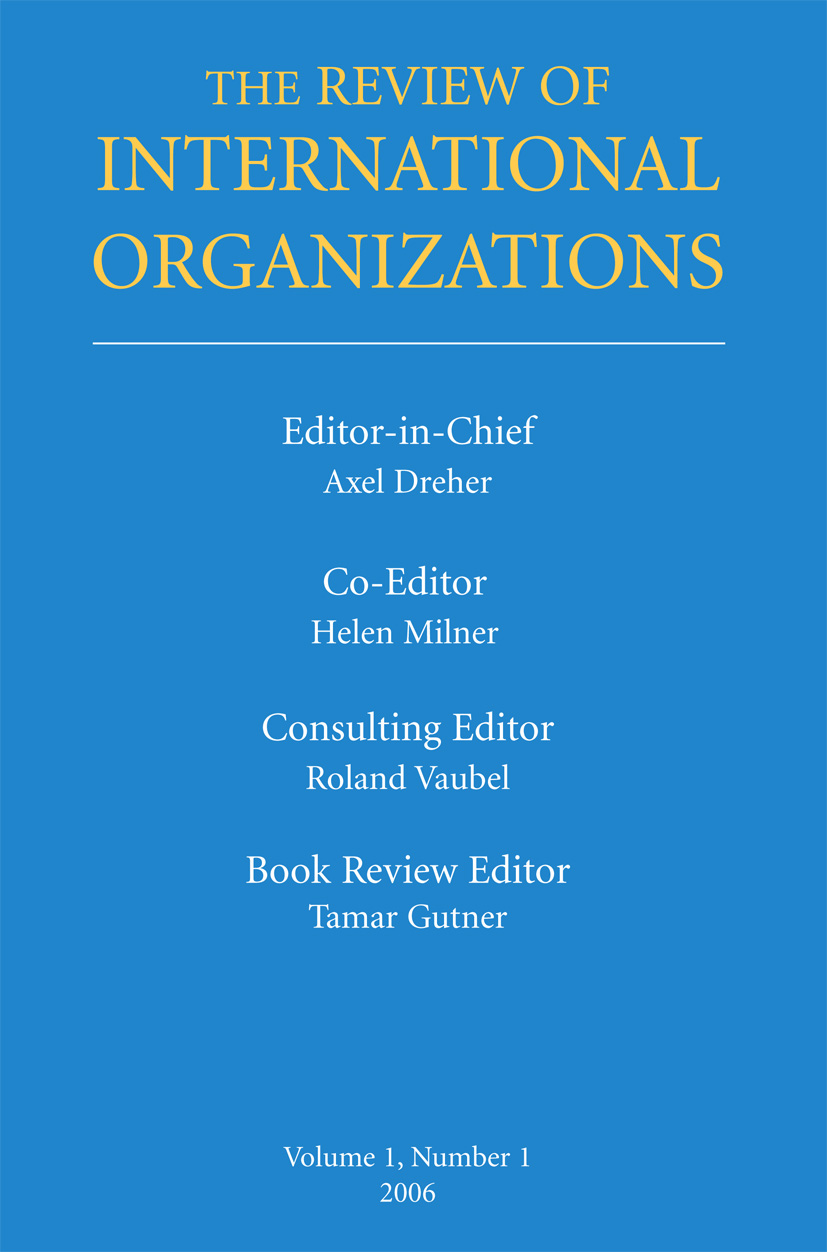
- Discipline: International relations, Political science, Economics
- Language: English
- Edited by: Axel Dreher

Publication details
- History: 2006–present
- Publisher: Springer Science+Business Media (Germany)
- Frequency: Quarterly
- Impact factor: 7.795 (2020)

Standard abbreviations
- ISO 4: Rev. Int. Organ.

Indexing
- ISSN: 1559-7431 (print); 1559-744X (web)
- LCCN: 2007204183
- OCLC no.: 392319231

Links
- Journal homepage; Online archive

The Review of International Organizations is a peer-reviewed academic journal that analyzes operations and policies of both governmental and non-governmental organizations. Scientific contributions cover agencies such as the International Monetary Fund, the World Trade Organization, the World Bank, the G7, the NATO, the European Court of Human Rights, the United Nations, and similar formal institutions. In addition, the journal offers research on networks of international cooperation, including the Global Development Network and the International Competition Forum.

The journal is published by Springer Boston. Its current editors are Axel Dreher (editor-in-chief, Heidelberg University), James Vreeland (associate editor, Princeton University) and Todd Sandler (associate editor, University of Texas at Dallas).

According to the Journal Citation Reports, the journal has a 2020 impact factor of 7.795, ranking it 5th out of 163 journals in the category "Political Science" and 1st out of 86 journals in the category "International Relations".

== See also ==
- List of international relations journals
- List of political science journals
- List of economics journals
