= James Vreeland =

American political scientist

- Born: 1971 (age 54–55); New York City, New York, U.S.
- Known for: Professor at Princeton University

James Raymond Vreeland (born 1971) is a professor of politics and International affairs in the Princeton School of Public and International Affairs and the Department of Politics at Princeton University. He conducts research in the field of international political economy, specializing in international institutions.

== Education and employment ==
Prior to joining the faculty at Princeton University in July 2018, he served as associate and full professor of political science at Georgetown University (2009-2018) and as assistant and associate professor of political science at Yale University (1999–2008). He has held visiting positions and affiliations at universities on five continents around the world, including the University of California, Los Angeles, the ETH Zürich, Bond University, the University of São Paulo, and most recently Korea University. He received his BA from Manhattan College, where he graduated Phi Beta Kappa and summa cum laude in 1994 and his PhD from New York University in 1999.

== Research ==
His research explores a range of policy outcomes, including economic growth and the distribution of income under programs of economic reform, the foreign policy positions of developing countries, the transparency of policy making under different political institutions, and the commitment of governments to defend human rights. His research addresses the ways in which international institutions interact with domestic politics. The domestic institutions he has focused on include both democracies and dictatorships, as well as intermediate regimes. His research is most known for its treatment of international institutions, particularly the International Monetary Fund (IMF), the World Bank, and the United Nations Security Council.

His first book, entitled The IMF and Economic Development (Cambridge University Press, March 2003), was critically and favorably reviewed by several scholars. He has more recently published an introductory book about the IMF, entitled The International Monetary Fund: Politics of Conditional Lending (Routledge, January 2007), which was carefully critiqued in a 20-page review by the deputy director of the IMF’s External Relations Department. He is also the co-editor of Globalization and the Nation State: The Impact of the IMF and the World Bank (Routledge, 2006), along with Gustav Ranis and Stephen Kosack. The book includes contributions from leading North American analysts such as Nancy Birdsall and Stephen Morris, as well as European-based analysts including Frances Stewart. He has published in numerous scholarly journals, including International Organization, Journal of Conflict Resolution, European Economic Review, Journal of Development Economics, Public Choice, World Development, International Political Science Review, Political Analysis, World Economics, and Foreign Policy Magazine. He currently serves as an associate editor for The Review of International Organizations. His research has led him to be covered by media internationally, including the Australian Broadcasting Corporation, DawnNews, BizRadio Network, the Washington Post, Financial Times Deutschland, De Tijd, and Der Bund.

== Major works ==
=== Books ===
- Vreeland, James Raymond (2007). The International Monetary Fund: Politics of Conditional Lending. New York: Routledge. ISBN 978-0-415-37462-0.
- Vreeland, James Raymond (2003). The IMF and Economic Development. New York: Cambridge University Press. ISBN 978-0-521-01695-7.

=== Scholarly articles ===
- Dreher, Axel, Jan-Egbert Sturm, and James Raymond Vreeland. 2009. Global horse trading: IMF loans for votes in the United Nations Security Council. European Economic Review: doi:10.1016/j.euroecorev.2009.03.002.
- Dreher, Axel, Jan-Egbert Sturm, and James Raymond Vreeland. 2009. Development Aid and International Politics: Does membership on the UN Security Council influence World Bank decisions? Journal of Development Economics 88 (1):1-18.
- Vreeland, James Raymond. 2008. The Effect of Political Regime on Civil War: Unpacking Anocracy. Journal of Conflict Resolution 52 (3):401-425.
- Vreeland, James Raymond. 2008. Political Institutions and Human Rights: Why Dictatorships enter into the United Nations Convention Against Torture. International Organization 62 (1):65-101.
- Vreeland, James Raymond. 2006. IMF Program Compliance: Aggregate Index versus Policy Specific Research Strategies. The Review of International Organizations 1 (4): 359-378.
- Vreeland, James Raymond. 2003. Why do governments and the IMF enter into agreements: Statistically selected case studies. International Political Science Review: Special Issue on The Political Economy of International Finance 24(3): 321-343.
- Vreeland, James Raymond. 2002. The Effect of IMF Programs on Labor. World Development 30(1): 121-139.
- Przeworski, Adam and James Raymond Vreeland. 2002. A Statistical Model of Bilateral Cooperation. Political Analysis 10(2): 101-112.
- Przeworski, Adam and James Raymond Vreeland. 2000. The Effect of IMF Programs on Economic Growth. Journal of Development Economics 62: 385-421.

=== Edited volumes ===
- Vreeland, James Raymond. 2008. The IMF and Economic Development. In William Easterly (ed.), Reinventing Foreign Aid. Cambridge, MA: MIT Press and Center for Global Development. pp. 351–376.
- Smith, Alastair and James Raymond Vreeland. 2006. The Survival of Political Leaders and IMF Programs. In Gustav Ranis, James Vreeland, and Stephen Kosack (eds.), Globalization and the Nation State: The Impact of the IMF and the World Bank. New York: Routledge. pp. 263–289.
- Vreeland, James Raymond. 2003. Buscando Condiciones, No Dinero: El acuerdo de Uruguay con el FMI en 1990. In Diego Aboal and Juan Andrés Moraes (eds. and translators), Economía Política en Uruguay: Instituciones y Actores Políticos en el Proceso Económico. Montevideo: Ediciones Trilce. pp. 73–92.
