= Hans-Wolfgang Arndt =

German jurist

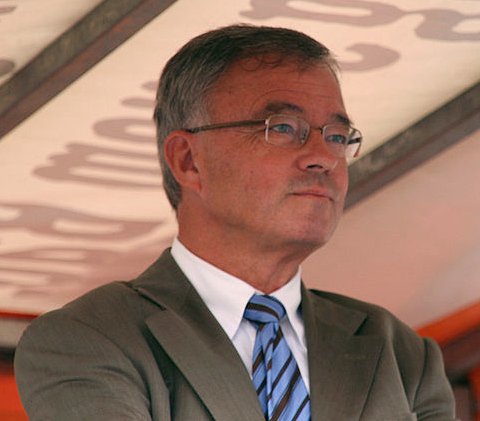
- Born: 2 April 1945 (age 81); Prague, Czech Republic
- Education: University of Tübingen; Humboldt University Berlin; Ruhr University Bochum; University of Mainz
- Scientific career
- Fields: Public Law, Corporate Law, Tax Law, Taxation
- Workplaces: University of Mannheim

Hans-Wolfgang Arndt (born 1945 in Prague, Czech Republic) is a German lawyer, professor for tax law and former president (rector) of the University of Mannheim from 2001 to 2012. Previously he was professor for tax law at the Department für Rechtswissenschaften (department of law) at the University of Konstanz.

== Education ==
He obtained his Ph.D. in law at the Ruhr University Bochum in 1972, after having earned the first and second Staatsexamen in law at the University of Tübingen and Humboldt University Berlin.

== Academics ==
Arndt worked as scientific assistant during the time of his second Staatsexamen studies and referendary at the University of Mainz. After having received his Ph.D. in 1972 and the following habilitation at the Ruhr University Bochum in 1977, Arndt conducted research and teaching at the University of Konstanz until 1983. In late 1982, the University of Mannheim (UMA) proposed Arndt a position as chaired professor at the Department of Tax and Public Law, a proposal that he accepted in 1983. In 2001 Arndt succeeded Peter Frankenberg in his role as rector of the university.

During his time as rector Arndt changed UMA's academic profile from a university with a broad subject offering to a university with a strong focus on interdisciplinary social sciences, business administration, economics, law and computer science research. This process called Profilschärfung (profile sharpening) took place between 2001-2008 and decreased the number of departments as well as offered subjects tremendously. Furthermore, Arndt pushed the development and introduction of an international business school at the University of Mannheim - the Mannheim Business School, that since its opening in 2005 has gained international reputation and a place among the best global business schools. Hans-Wolfgang Arndt's period as rector at University of Mannheim ended in July 2012 with his retirement, his successor is Ernst-Ludwig von Thadden.
