= Christiane Woopen =

German medical ethicist (born 1962)

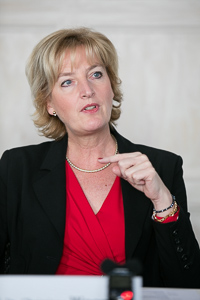
- Woopen in 2015
- Born: 12 December 1962 (age 63)

Academic background
- Education: University of Bonn (MD); University of Cologne (Habilitation)

Academic work
- Discipline: Physician
- Sub-discipline: Medical ethics
- Institutions: University of Cologne

Christiane Woopen (born 12 December 1962) is a German medical ethicist. She was appointed Professor for Ethics and Theory of Medicine at the University of Cologne in 2009. There she is Executive Director of ceres (Cologne Center for Ethics, Rights, Economics, and Social Sciences of Health), an interdepartmental institution created by the Rector and five of the six Faculties of Cologne University. Furthermore, she is Head of the Research Unit Ethics at the Faculty of Medicine and was from 2011 to 2019 Vice-Dean for Academic Development and Gender of that Faculty. From 2012 to 2016 she was Chair of the German Ethics Council and from 2014 to 2016 President of the Global Summit of National Ethics/Bioethics Committees. She has been portrayed by various periodicals.

== Education and professional work ==
Woopen received the degree of Doctor of Medicine in 1993 from the University of Bonn. After having worked as a doctor in gynecology and obstetrics, Woopen changed her professional activities and focused on medical ethics. From 1990–1995 she studied philosophy in Bonn and Hagen. In 2005, she received Habilitation and venia legendi for Ethics and Theory of Medicine, from the Faculty of Medicine at University of Cologne.

Her main research interests pertain to ethical questions in reproductive and prenatal medicine, neuroethics, health literacy and quality of life as well as the future of health care in times of digitalization. She mainly engages in inter- and transdisciplinary research projects, partly in international consortia.

== Memberships ==
Woopen is member in numerous advisory bodies. Among others, she was member of the National Ethics Council (known since 2008 as the German Ethics Council) from 2001 to 2016. She was elected Deputy Chair of the council from 2008–2012 and Chair from 2012–2016. Since 2010, she is member of the International Bioethics Committee of UNESCO.

In April 2020, Woopen was appointed by Minister-President Armin Laschet of North Rhine-Westphalia to a 12-member expert group to advise on economic and social consequences of the COVID-19 pandemic in Germany. In 2023, she was appointed to a government commission on reproductive self-determination and health.

Other memberships include:

- Deutsche Telekom, Member of the Data Privacy Advisory Board
- Institute for Quality and Efficiency in Health Care, Member of the Scientific Advisory Board
- European Academy of Sciences and Arts, Member

== Publications and academic activities ==
- Woopen, C.: Gesundheitskompetenz. In: Sturma, D., Heinrichs, B. (Hg.): Handbuch Bioethik. J.B. Metzler, Stuttgart 2015.
- Woopen, C (2014). "Die Bedeutung von Lebensqualität aus ethischer Perspektive". Z. Evid. Fortbild. Qual. Gesundhwes. 108 (2–3): 140–145. doi:10.1016/j.zefq.2014.03.002. PMID 24780712.
- Woopen, C.: Weimarer Reden 2014: Emanzipiert Euch! – Der ungebildete Kranke. Über Herrschaft und Beherrschung der Medizin – http://www.nationaltheater-weimar.de/de/index/spielplan/stuecke_extras/stuecke_details.php?SID=1403 (Audio).
- Woopen, C.; Pauls, A. K.; Koy, A.; Moro, E.; Timmermann, L. (2013). "Early application of deep brain stimulation: Clinical and ethical issues". Progress in Neurobiology. 110: 74–88. doi:10.1016/j.pneurobio.2013.04.002. PMID 23628580. S2CID 22831432.
- Woopen, C.; Timmermann, L.; Kuhn, J. (2012). "An ethical framework for outcome assessment in psychiatric DBS". AJOB Neuroscience. 3 (1): 50–55. doi:10.1080/21507740.2011.635631. S2CID 144625387.
- Woopen, C.: Ethical Aspects of Neuromodulation. In Clement Hamani and Elena Moro (ed.): Emerging Horizons in Neuromodulation, Vol 107, International Review Neurobiology, UK: Academic Press, 2012 pp. 315–332. doi:10.1016/B978-0-12-404706-8.00016-4
- Woopen, C.: Der Arzt als Heiler und Manager. Zur erforderlichen Integration des scheinbar Unvereinbaren. In: Katzenmeier, C.; Bergdolt, K.: Das Bild des Arztes im 21. Jahrhundert. Springer, Heidelberg 2009, 181–194.
- Woopen, C.: Solidarische Gesundheitsversorgung – Was schulden wir uns gegenseitig? In: Schäfer, D.; Frewer, A.; Schockenhoff, E.; Wetzstein, V. (Hg.): Gesundheitskonzepte im Wandel. Geschichte, Ethik und Gesellschaft. Franz Steiner Verlag, Stuttgart 2008, 189–199.
- Rohde, A., Woopen, C.: Psychosoziale Beratung im Kontext von Pränataldiagnostik. Evaluation der Modellprojekte in Bonn, Düsseldorf und Essen. Deutscher Ärzteverlag, Köln 2007.
- Woopen, C.: Selektion aufgrund genetischer Diagnostik? Handlungstheoretisch fundierte Güterethik und ihre Anwendung am Beispiel der Präimplantationsdiagnostik. In: Honnefelder, L.; Streffer, C. (Hg.): Jahrbuch für Wissenschaft und Ethik, Band 10, de Gruyter, Berlin, New York 2005, 343–353.
