= Claus E. Heinrich =

German manager and entrepreneur

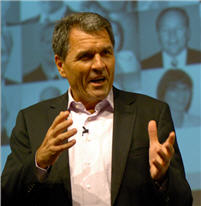
- Heinrich in 2007
- Born: 21 June 1955 (age 71); Waiblingen, Baden-Württemberg, Germany
- Education: University of Mannheim
- Scientific career
- Fields: Business Administration, Operations Research
- Workplaces: University of Mannheim, Technische Universität Berlin, Heidelberg University

Claus E. Heinrich (born 21 June 1955) is a German manager, entrepreneur, who is an honorary professor for operations research at both Technische Universität Berlin and the University of Mannheim and served as board member of SAP between 1996 and 2009. Since 2009 he serves as honorary senator of the Heidelberg University.

== Education ==
Heinrich was born in Waiblingen, Baden-Württemberg, Germany. He studied operations research and business administration at the University of Mannheim from 1976 to 1981, where he obtained his Diplom-Kaufmann (the pre-Bologna Process equivalent of a master's degree). Afterwards, he obtained his Ph.D. in operations research and supply chain management in 1986 at the University of Mannheim and was visiting researcher at Cornell University, Ithaca, New York.

== Career ==
He started his career in 1987 and entered the SAP AG in Walldorf, Germany, where he quickly earned the responsibility for the R&D area "Logistics Controlling". He became member of the global executive committee of SAP in 1996, where he was for the company's product area of supply chain management. He left SAP in 2009 and founded the Sovanta AG that focus on end-to-end business application services.

== Personal life ==
Heinrich lives in Heidelberg, is married and father of four children. He is author of several books, including "Adapt or Die - Transforming Your Supply Chain into an Adaptive Business Network" and "RFID and Beyond - Growing Your Business Through Real World Awareness".

== See also ==
- List of University of Mannheim people
- University of Mannheim
