= Achim Wambach =

German economist

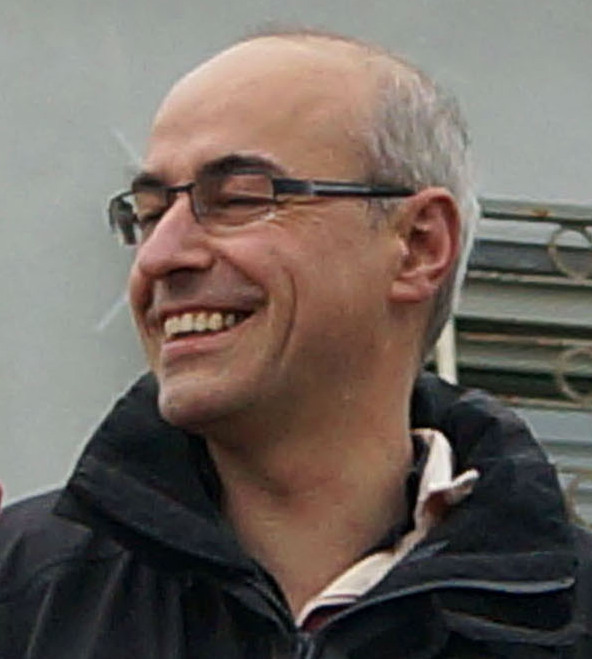
- Achim Wambach
- Born: 1968 (age 57–58); Germany
- Occupation: economist
- Known for: ZWE President (2016-)

Achim Wambach (1968) is a German economist and President of the ZEW – Leibniz Centre for European Economic Research. Since 2006, he has been a member of the academic Advisory Board of the Federal Ministry for Economic Affairs, and served as its chairman from 2012 to 2015. In 2014, he was appointed to Germany's Monopolies Commission as the successor to Justus Haucap. Following the resignation of Daniel Zimmer as Chairman of the Monopolies Commission in March 2016, Wambach took over this position until 2020. Since April 1, 2016, Wambach has been President of the ZEW. He succeeded Clemens Fuest, who moved to the Ifo Institute for Economic Research. In October 2024, he was appointed to the German Ethics Council.

== Life ==
After dual studies in Physics and Mathematics at the University of Cologne from 1988 to 1991, with a minor in Business Mathematics (pre-diploma 1990), Wambach transferred to the University of Oxford on a DAAD scholarship, where he earned his doctorate in physics in 1994. Following a Master of Science (M.Sc.) in Economics from the London School of Economics and Political Science (LSE) in 1995, he completed his Habilitation in Economics at LMU Munich in 2000. From 2001 to 2005, he held the Chair of Economics, specializing in Economic theory, at the University of Erlangen–Nuremberg. From 2005 to 2016, he was a professor of Economic State Sciences at the University of Cologne. In 2007/2008, Wambach was President of the European Group of Risk and Insurance Economists. He has also been a member of the Steering Committee of the German National Platform for Electric Mobility (NPE) of the Federal Government since 2015 and has been a member of the German Academy of Science and Engineering (acatech) since 2016. In April 2016, he became President of the ZEW – Leibniz Centre for European Economic Research. For the duration of the special report on the evaluation of the Risk Structure Compensation (February to September 2017), he was appointed to the Scientific Advisory Board for the Further Development of the Risk Structure Compensation at the Federal Insurance Office (Bundesversicherungsamt). From 2017 to 2018, Wambach was also Chairman of the German Economic Association. Furthermore, since April 2016, he has been a professor of economics at the University of Mannheim.

Wambach's research focuses on Competition policy, market design, Industrial organization, and Auction theory, as well as applications of Information economics in health and insurance markets. Besides his academic work, Wambach is a co-founder of the economics consulting firm TWS Partners.

Achim Wambach was appointed to the German Ethics Council on October 10, 2024.

== Publications (Selection) ==
- Klima muss sich lohnen. Ökonomische Vernunft für ein gutes Gewissen. Herder 2022, ISBN 978-3-451-39358-7. (Climate Must Pay Off. Economic Reason for a Clear Conscience.)
- Digitaler Wohlstand für alle: Ein Update der Sozialen Marktwirtschaft ist möglich. Campus Verlag 2018, ISBN 978-3593509297. (Digital Prosperity for All: An Update of the Social Market Economy is Possible.)
- Procurement under public scrutiny: auctions versus negotiations, RAND Journal of Economics 47, 914–934 (2016) (with Vitali Gretschko)
- Contracts and inequity aversion, Games and Economic Behavior 69, 312–328 (2010) (with Florian Englmaier)
- The treadmill effect in a fixed budget system, Journal of Health Economics 25, 146–169 (2006) (with Franz Benstetter)
- Adverse selection and categorical discrimination in health insurance markets: The effects of genetic testing, Journal of Health Economics 19, 197–218 (2000) (with Rainer Strohmenger)
- Wealth effects in the principal agent model, Journal of Economic Theory 89, 247–260 (1999) (with Henrik Thiele)

== Awards ==
- In 1995, Wambach was awarded the Ely Devons Prize for his achievements at the LSE.
- In 2001, he received the Ernst Meyer Prize from the Geneva Association for his Habilitation thesis.
- In 2007, he received the Prize for Health economics from the German Economic Association.
- In 2016, he was elected to the German Academy of Science and Engineering (acatech).
- In 2016, he was ranked 10th in the Ranking of the Most Influential Economists in Germany by the FAZ.

In 2019, he delivered the keynote speech on the Social Market Economy (Prize of the German Economic Policy Club) and the Friedrich August von Hayek Lecture 2019.
