= Eduard Gaugler =

German researcher and economist

- Born: 23 June 1928; Stuttgart, Baden-Württemberg, Germany
- Died: 12 April 2014 (aged 85)
- Education: Ludwig-Maximilians-Universität München
- Awards: Honorary doctorates from Catholic University of Eichstätt-Ingolstadt, John Paul II Catholic University of Lublin, and the University of Passau
- Scientific career
- Fields: Business Administration, Human Resource Management
- Workplaces: University of Regensburg; University of Mannheim

Eduard Gaugler (23 June 1928 – 12 April 2014) was a German researcher, economist and former professor for human resource management at both the University of Regensburg and the University of Mannheim from 1972 to 1989. Moreover, he served as rector of the University of Mannheim between 1973 and 1976.

== Education ==
Gaugler was born in Stuttgart, Baden-Württemberg, Germany. He studied economics and business administration at the Ludwig-Maximilians-Universität München from 1949 to 1954, where he obtained his Diplom-Kaufmann (former German master's equivalent). Afterwards, he obtained his Ph.D. in business administration and his habilitation in 1966 at the Ludwig-Maximilians-Universität München.

== Academics ==
He worked from 1967 to 1972 as professor at the University of Regensburg. After a proposal in 1972, he became professor for human resource management and general business administration at the University of Mannheim (UMA) where he succeeded August Marx. At the University of Mannheim his research focused primarily on human resource management, Corporate Governance and corporate social politics. In 1973 Gaugler became professor of the university. Furthermore, he succeeded Peter Frankenberg in his role as rector of the university in 1973 and remained in this position until 1976. From 1991 to 1998, Gaugler served as director of the Institute für Mittelstandsforschung (Institute for Small- and Medium Sized Companies) at the UMA, where he conducted research on the German Mittelstand.

== Publications ==
- Eduard Gaugler: Instanzenbildung als Problem der betrieblichen Führungsorganisation, Habilitationsschrift, Berlin 1966.
- Eduard Gaugler (Hrsg.): Verantwortliche Betriebsführung. Professor Dr. Guido Fischer zum 70. Geburtstag am 8. Juni 1969, Stuttgart 1969.
- Eduard Gaugler: Betriebliche Personalplanung. Eine Literaturanalyse, Göttingen 1974.
- Eduard Gaugler, Bernd Weber: Die Personalberatung. Aufgaben, Leistungsangebot, Arbeitsweise, Kosten, Freiburg i.Br. 1988.
- Eduard Gaugler: Zur Weiterentwicklung der BWL als Management- und Führungslehre, in: Rolf Wunderer (Hrsg.), Betriebswirtschaftslehre als Management- und Führungslehre, Stuttgart 1988, S. 147-168.
- Eduard Gaugler, Matthias Mungenast: Organisation der Aus- und Weiterbildung, in: Erich Frese (Hrsg.), Handwörterbuch der Organisation, 3. Aufl., Stuttgart 1992, Sp. 237-252.
- Eduard Gaugler: Information als Führungsaufgabe, in: Alfred Kieser u.a. (Hrsg.), Handwörterbuch der Führung, 2. Aufl., Stuttgart 1995, Sp. 1175-1185.
- Eduard Gaugler, Walter A. Oechsler: Herausforderungen an das Personalmanagement in Gegenwart und Zukunft, Mannheim 1997.
- Eduard Gaugler: Hundert Jahre Betriebswirtschaftslehre, Mannheim 1998.
- Eduard Gaugler, Richard Köhler (Hrsg.): Entwicklungen der Betriebswirtschaftslehre. 100 Jahre Fachdisziplin - zugleich eine Verlagsgeschichte, Stuttgart 2002.
- Eduard Gaugler, Walter A. Oechsler, Wolfgang Weber: Personalwesen, in: Dies. (Hrsg.), Handwörterbuch des Personalwesens, 3. Aufl., Stuttgart 2004, Sp. 1653-1663.
- Eduard Gaugler: Geschichte des Personalwesens, in: E. Gaugler, W.A. Oechsler, W. Weber (Hrsg.), Handwörterbuch des Personalwesens, 3. Aufl., Stuttgart 2004, Sp. 837-853.
- Eduard Gaugler: Arbeitsbeziehungen in der Europäischen Union. Erweiterte Fassung von Vorträgen im Rahmen des Deutsch-Japanischen Jahres 2005 bei Symposien an der Meiji-Universität in Tokio und an der Kwansei-Gakuin-Universität in Nishinomiya, Mannheim 2005.
- Eduard Gaugler, Walter A. Oechsler (eds.): Erinnerungen an August Marx (1906-1990), Mannheim 2007.
- Eduard Gaugler: Mitbestimmung der Arbeitnehmer in der Betriebs- und Unternehmensverfassung. Erweiterte Fassung des Beitrags "Betriebs- und Unternehmensverfassung" zum "Handbuch der Katholischen Soziallehre" Berlin 2007, Mannheim 2007.
- Eduard Gaugler: Wandel der Arbeitsbeziehungen in Deutschland. Erweiterte Fassung eines Vortrags bei der Internationalen Konferenz 2007 an der Sangji-Universität in Wonju/Korea, Mannheim 2007.
- Eduard Gaugler: Partnerschaft in Wirtschaft und Betrieb - Sechzig Jahre AGB, Mannheim 2011

== See also ==
- Munich
- List of University of Mannheim people
- University of Mannheim
- University of Regensburg
