= Peter Frankenberg =

German politician

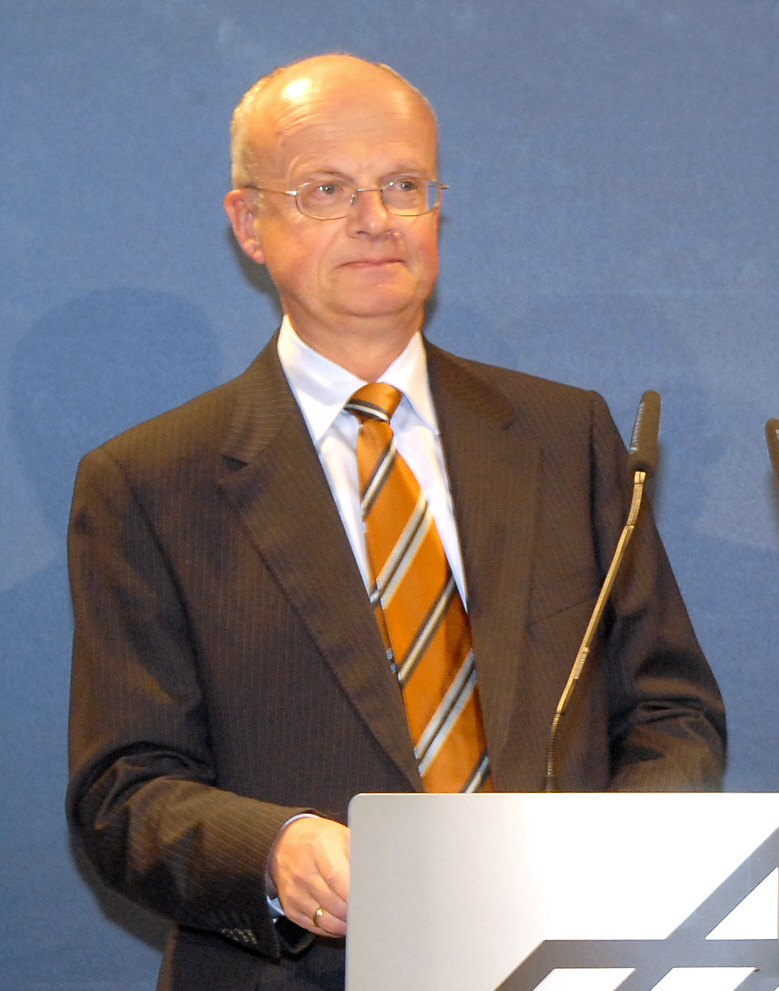
- Born: 29 June 1947 (age 79); Bad Honnef, North Rhine-Westphalia, Germany
- Education: University of Bonn
- Scientific career
- Fields: History, Geography, Geology
- Workplaces: University of Mannheim

Peter Frankenberg (born 1947 in Bad Honnef, North Rhine-Westphalia, Germany) is a German researcher, professor and politician (CDU). Frankenberg was Minister of Science, Research and the Arts of the state of Baden-Württemberg (Ministerium für Wissenschaft, Forschung und Kunst Baden-Württemberg) from 2001 to 2011. Previously he was chaired professor and President (rector) at the University of Mannheim from 1994 until 2001.

== Education ==
He studied history, geography and geology at the University of Bonn, afterwards botanics. He achieved his Ph.D. in 1976 and attained his title of professor in 1982.

== Academics and career ==
In 1983, he was appointed professor of physical geography at the Catholic University of Eichstätt-Ingolstadt. In 1986, Frankenberg received the lectureship for physical geography and regional studies at the Geographic Institute of the University of Mannheim. From 1989 until 1991, Peter Frankenberg was dean and pro-dean respectively at the faculty of history and geography and from 1991 until 1994, pro-rector of research at the University of Mannheim. From October 1994 to summer 2001 he was President (rector) of the University of Mannheim. From June 2001 to 2011 he served as Minister of Science, Research and the Arts of the State of Baden-Württemberg.

== Personal life ==
Frankenberg is married and has three children.

== See also ==
- Baden-Württemberg
- List of University of Mannheim people
