= Axel Dreher =

German economist (born 1972)

Axel Dreher (born September 17, 1972) is a German economist.

He earned a master's degree from the University of Mannheim in 1999, and a Ph.D. in 2003. He is among the 500 top economists of the world according to the IDEAS/RePEc. According to research.com he is Germany's best Political Scientist and ranks second in Economics and Finance there. ScholarGPS includes him as a top-300 economist and among the leading 10,000 scientists of all fields worldwide.

As professor of economics at the University of Göttingen and assistant professor at the universities of Mannheim, Exeter, Konstanz and ETH Zurich he has worked in fields including:

- the public-choice-analysis of international organizations, especially International Monetary Fund and World Bank
- economic development, especially foreign aid
- public economics, especially corruption and shadow economy

Dreher is professor of international and development politics at the Ruprecht-Karl University of Heidelberg. He developed the KOF Index of Globalization at ETH in Zürich, is part of the team providing the Geocoded Official Development Dataset (GODAD) and is editor-in-chief of the Review of International Organizations. He is Co-Director of the Center for European Studies (CefES), Faculty Associate of AidData, Fellow of CEPR, CESifo, KOF, and the European Development Network, as well as a member of the German National Academy of Sciences Leopoldina. He is a first-generation academic.
