= Claudia Wiesemann =

German medical ethicist and medical historian

- Education: University of Münster
- Scientific career
- Fields: Medical ethics and history
- Workplaces: University of Göttingen; University of Erlangen-Nuremberg

Claudia Wiesemann is a German medical ethicist and medical historian. She is full professor and head of the Department of Medical Ethics and History of Medicine at Göttingen University Medical Center. Being a member of the German Ethics Council since 2012, she was elected Deputy Chair in 2016.

== Education and professional work ==
Claudia Wiesemann studied Medicine, Philosophy, and Medical History at Münster University, Germany. In 1990, she finished her thesis on the history of therapeutic nihilism in the 19th century. From 1990 to 1998, she worked as Assistant Professor at the University of Erlangen-Nuremberg. In 1998, she was appointed Full Professor and head of the Department for Medical Ethics and History of Medicine at the University of Göttingen. She completed all medical exams at Münster University, Germany, in 1985 and worked as resident from 1986 to 1988.

Claudia Wiesemann is vice chair of the German National Ethics Council. From 2002 to 2012, she was President of the de:Akademie für Ethik in der Medizin (AEM), the academic society for medical ethics in the German speaking countries. Since 2011, she is member of the Central Ethics Committee at the Federal Board of Physicians. From 2002 to 2011, she was member of the Central Ethics Committee for Stem Cell Research at Robert-Koch-Institut. In 2010 and 2014, she was appointed Associate Fellow at the Göttingen Institute for Advanced Studies "Lichtenberg-Kolleg". Other board memberships include: from 2008 to 2010 Member of the Committee for Ethics in Research with Children of the Deutsche Akademie für Kinderheilkunde und Jugendmedizin, 2012–2015 Member of the I-DSD Steering Committee, 2008–2012 Member of the Ethics Advisory Board, EuroDSD, 7th Framework Programme (Speaker: O. Hiort, Lübeck), since 1998 Member of the Research Ethics Committee, Göttingen University Medical Center, and 1998–2007 Secretary, Scientific Board of the European Association for the History of Medicine and Health. From 1978 to 1984, she received a student fellowship of the prestigious Studienstiftung des Deutschen Volkes. She is serving as an editorial board member of several international journals.

Wiesemann's research interests include autonomy and trust in medicine, the ethics of reproductive medicine and family, child rights and the moral status of the child, the ethics of intersex, the history and ethics of organ transplantation and the determination of death.

== Publications ==
- Wiesemann C.: Moral Equality, Bioethics, and the Child. Springer, 2016, ISBN 978-3-319-32400-5.
- Autonomie und Vertrauen. Schlüsselbegriffe der modernen Medizin. (together with H. Steinfath a.o.), Springer VS, Wiesbaden 2016, ISBN 3658110732.
- Bernstein S, Wiesemann C (2014): Should Postponing Motherhood via 'Social Freezing' Be Legally Banned? An Ethical Analysis. Laws, 3:282-300.
- Patientenautonomie. Theoretische Grundlagen - praktische Anwendungen . (together with A. Simon), mentis, Münster 2013, ISBN 978-3-89785-804-6.
- Human Tissue Research. A European Perspective on the Ethical and Legal Challenges. (together with C. Lenk, N. Hoppe, K. Beier), Oxford University Press, Oxford 2011, ISBN 9780199587551.
- Teaching Ethics in Organ Transplantation and Tissue Donation. (together with S. Schicktanz, S. Wöhlke, and Amnon Carmi, UNESCO Chair in Bioethics), Universitätsverlag, Göttingen 2010, ISBN 978-3-941875-40-1.
- Klinge I.; Wiesemann C. (Eds.) (2010) Sex and Gender in Biomedicine. Theories, Methodologies, Results. Göttingen, Universitätsverlag.
- Wiesemann, C. (2010) The Moral Challenge of Natality: Towards a Post-traditional Concept of Family and Privacy in Reprogenetics. New Genetics and Society 29, S. 61-71.
- Sommer, C.; Boos, M.; Conradi, E.; Biller-Andorno, N.; Wiesemann, C. (2011) Care and Justice in the Ethical Reasoning of Medical Students. Ramon Llul Journal of Applied Ethics 1, S. 9-32
- Wiesemann, C.; Ude-Koeller, S.; Sinnecker, G. H.; Thyen, U. (2010) Ethical principles and recommendations for the medical management of differences of sex development (DSD) / intersex in children and adolescents. European Journal of Pediatrics 169, S. 671-679.
- Wiesemann, C. (2010) Ethical Guidelines for the Clinical Management of Intersex. Sexual Development 4, S. 300-303.
- Lenk, C.; Koch, P.; Zappel, H.; Wiesemann, C. (2009) Off-label, off-limits? Parental awareness and attitudes towards off-label use in paediatrics. European Journal of Pediatrics 168, S. 1473-1478.
- Wiesemann C. (2006) The Contribution of Medical History to Medical Ethics. The Case of Brain Death. In: C. Rehmann-Sutter, M. Düwell, D. Mieth (Eds) Bioethics in Cultural Contexts. Springer, Heidelberg, New York, S. 187-196.
- Von der Verantwortung, ein Kind zu bekommen. Eine Ethik der Elternschaft. C. H. Beck, München 2006, ISBN 978-3406542725.
- Medizinethik. Thieme, Stuttgart 2005 (together with N. Biller-Andorno). ISBN 3-13-138241-4
- Lenk C., Radenbach K., Dahl M., Wiesemann C. (2004) Non-therapeutic research with minors: how do chairpersons of German research ethics committees decide? Journal of medical ethics 30, 85-87.
- Wiesemann C. (2000) Defining Brain Death: The German Debate in Historical Perspective. In: J. Woodward, R. Jütte (Eds) Coping With Sickness: Medicine, Law and Human Rights - Historical Perspectives. Sheffield, S. 149-169.
- Hirntod. Zur Kulturgeschichte der Todesfeststellung. (together with Thomas Schlich), Suhrkamp 2001, ISBN 978-3518291252.
- Die heimliche Krankheit. Zur Geschichte des Suchtbegriffs. frommann-holzboog, Stuttgart-Bad Cannstatt 2000. ISBN 3-7728-2000-X
- Josef Dietl und der therapeutische Nihilismus. Zum historischen und politischen Hintergrund einer medizinischen These. Peter Lang, Frankfurt/M 1991. ISBN 3-631-42684-4
