= Marita Inglehart =

American psychologist and author (born 1951)

Marita Rohr Inglehart
- Occupations: Behavioral scientist, academic, and author

Academic background
- Education: University of Mannheim

Academic work
- Institutions: University of Michigan

Marita Rohr Inglehart is a psychologist, academic, and author. She is a professor at the Department of Periodontics and Oral medicine at the School of Dentistry, an Adjunct Professor at the Department of Psychology at the College of Literature, Arts and Sciences at the University of Michigan. Additionally, she also holds the position of Inaugural University Diversity and Social Transformation Professor at the University of Michigan.

Inglehart is most known for her work on dental education and behavioral sciences research in dentistry, primarily focusing on gaining a better understanding how psychosocial factors, especially diversity, equity and inclusion related factors affect oral health and oral health care. She has authored numerous books, including Reactions to Critical Life Events. A Social Psychological Analysis and Oral Health-Related Quality of Life, and over 150 peer-reviewed articles. In 2022, her interview was featured as a book chapter in Contemporary Pioneers in Human Learning and Development, written by H. Bembenutty.

== Education ==
Inglehart obtained a Vordiplom in Psychology in 1972 followed by a Diploma in Psychology in 1975 from the University of Mannheim. Later, she completed her PhD in Psychology in 1978 and then her habilitation (Dr. phil. habil.) in 1983 from the same institution.

== Career ==
Inglehart began her academic career in 1975 at the University of Mannheim, West Germany, where she held multiple appointments including assistant professor from 1975 to 1979, Research Scientist at the Center for Research on Decision Making (SFB24) and Adjunct Assistant Professor from 1979 to 1983 in the Faculty of Social Sciences, and Privatdozent in the Department of Psychology until 1989. In 1984, she joined the University of Michigan as a Visiting assistant professor, and served as an Adjunct Assistant Professor in the Department of Psychology from 1986 to 1993, while also working as a Senior Research Associate at the Center for Research on Learning and Teaching. Following that, she held an appointment as an associate professor in the Department of Periodontics and Oral Medicine between 1993 and 2008, while concurrently serving as an Adjunct Associate Professor at the Department of Psychology from 1993 to 2004. Between 2008 and 2013, she was appointed as an associate professor at the Department of Periodontics and Oral Medicine. As of 2013, she holds the position of Professor at the Department of Periodontics and Oral Medicine and serves as an adjunct professor at the Department of Psychology. Additionally, she has been an Adjunct faculty member of the Gender and Feminist psychology Section within the Department of Psychology since 2018, and was appointed as an Inaugural University Diversity and Social Transformation Professor at the University of Michigan since 2019.

== Research ==
Inglehart introduced the Awareness-Skill-Knowledge (A-S-K) Humanistic Model of Professional Education. This model postulates that raising awareness (A), providing skills (S) training and a solid knowledge (K) base will shape healthcare providers’ professional attitudes and behavior. Specifically, this model explains that the combination of raised awareness and skills results in a solid commitment, the combination of skills and knowledge creates true expertise and the combined awareness and knowledge will create true understanding. Her work in behavioral dentistry has focused on oral health-related quality of life contributions and oral health care for patients from underserved backgrounds such as patients from socioeconomically disadvantaged backgrounds, patients with ability differences and patients from LGBTQ+ backgrounds. She developed the Motivational Communication Approach to patient education. She has authored numerous publications in the areas of dental education, preventive dentistry, and behavioral dentistry, spanning books, book chapters and over 150 articles in peer-reviewed journals.

=== Dental education ===
Inglehart's research on dental education has primarily focused on curriculum design, teaching methods, student learning outcomes, faculty development, and policy initiatives. Her early research investigated dental and dental hygiene students' perspectives, expertise, and dispositions concerning the provision of healthcare to individuals diagnosed with HIV infections/AIDS and offered valuable perspectives concerning the disparities observed in workplace encounters and perspectives between male and female dental faculty members. Focusing on dental and dental hygiene education for patients with special needs, she conducted a survey of US and Canadian dental schools and suggested that revision of dental curricula and provision of additional didactic and clinical training could alleviate the discrepancies in oral health outcomes and healthcare accessibility between patients with special needs and those without such conditions. In a collaborative study with Lee, Bennet, and others, she investigated the periodontal treatment and referral patterns of general dentists and revealed that many general dentists fail to refer enough patients for periodontal treatment, potentially compromising patient care. Her 2015 national survey has highlighted the challenges associated with implementing interprofessional education IPE including coordinating schedules and managing curriculum overload and highlighted that while U.S. dental hygiene programs frequently collaborate with nursing and other allied health programs, their collaborations with dental schools are relatively less common. In 2021, her work examined the performance and attitudes of orthodontic residents in relation to different surgical simulation methods, establishing advanced simulation methods, specifically 3D and virtual reality (VR) as an effective alternative to traditional 2D orthognathic surgical simulation methods when used in conjunction with traditional records.

=== Oral health challenges in cancer patients ===
Inglehart's 2003 collaborative study with Henson and others focused on preserving salivatory outputs in head and neck patients and proposed the use of three-dimensional treatment planning and conformational dose-delivery methods to minimize radiation exposure to the contralateral parotid glands while ensuring effective tumor dosing in patients with head and neck cancer. Furthermore, she investigated multiple facets of periodontal health in early-stage postmenopausal breast cancer survivors taking aromatase inhibitors and revealed that women undergoing treatment with Aromatase Inhibitors (AIs) after surviving breast cancer reported significantly poorer subjective periodontal health, subjective oral health, and oral health-related quality of life compared to women without a cancer diagnosis. In related research, she determined that practical clinical encounters were more effective than educational programs in oncology nurses' oral healthcare instruction for breast cancer patients, emphasizing the importance of improving oral health education among nurses.

=== Human behavior studies ===
Inglehart's research on human behavior has examined the effects of emotional well-being on various aspects of life. In examining the influence of professional identities on scholastic attainment, her study found a connection between 'possible selves' and motivation. The cognitive/organizational facet established clear goals, while the energizing aspect provided the necessary persistence in pursuing those goals. In her book, Reactions to Critical Life Events: A Social Psychological Analysis, she offered a perspective on understanding people's reactions to significant life events and discussed the role of life philosophies and the practical implications for counseling based on the generalized principle of cognitive consistency. Moreover, her evaluation of the vascular theory of emotional efference (VTEE) has shed light on how facial muscular activity can impact arterial blood circulation to the brain, influencing emotional disposition.

== Awards and honors ==
- 1986 - European Community, Research Award for Young Researchers
- 1995 - AADS Award for Best New Program in Dental Education
- 1998 - Ida Gray Award, School of Dentistry, University of Michigan
- 1998 – Diversity Narrative Award, Center for Research on Learning and Teaching,
- 1999 – ADEA Award for Best New Program in Dental Education
- 2003 – ADEA Award for Best New Program in Dental Education
- 2009 – DENTSPLY/Harold Slavkin Oral Health Science Education Award from FNIDCR
- 2012 – Fellow, APS
- 2017 – Distinguished Mentor Award, University of Michigan – School of Dentistry
- 2019 – Harold R. Johnson Diversity Lifetime Achievement Service Award, University of Michigan
- 2019 – Carol Hollenshead Award, Center for the Education of Women (CEW)
- 2019 – Inaugural University Diversity and Social Transformation Professorship, University of Michigan

== Bibliography ==
=== Books ===
- Auslaendische Arbeitnehmer und Immigranten – Sozial wissenschaftliche Beitraege zur Diskussion eines aktuellen Problems (1985) ISBN 3407571070
- Reactions to critical life events. A social psychological analysis (1991) ISBN 9780275938758
- Kritische Lebensereignisse: Eine sozialpsychologische Analyse (1998) ISBN 9783170098145
- Oral Health-related Quality of Life (2011) ISBN 9780867154214

=== Selected articles ===
- Zajonc, R. B., Murphy, S. T., & Inglehart, M. (1989). Feeling and facial efference: implications of the vascular theory of emotion. Psychological Review, 96(3), 395.
- Inglehart, M., & Tedesco, L. A. (1995). Behavioral research related to oral hygiene practices: a new century model of oral health promotion. Periodontology 2000, 8(1), 15–23.
- Henson, B. S., Inglehart, M. R., Eisbruch, A., & Ship, J. A. (2001). Preserved salivary output and xerostomia-related quality of life in head and neck cancer patients receiving parotid-sparing radiotherapy. Oral oncology, 37(1), 84–93.
- Seacat, J. P., & Inglehart, M. R. (2003). Education about treating patients with HIV infections/AIDS: the student perspective. Journal of Dental Education, 67(6), 630–640.
- Heydecke, G., Tedesco, L. A., Kowalski, C., & Inglehart, M. R. (2004). Complete dentures and oral health‐related quality of life–do coping styles matter?. Community dentistry and oral epidemiology, 32(4), 297–306.
- Dao, L. P., Zwetchkenbaum, S., & Inglehart, M. R. (2005). General dentists and special needs patients: does dental education matter?. Journal of Dental Education, 69(10), 1107–1115.
- Smith, C. S., Ester, T. V., & Inglehart, M. R. (2006). Dental education and care for underserved patients: an analysis of students’ intentions and alumni behavior. Journal of dental education, 70(4), 398–408.
- Rich III, J. P., Straffon, L., & Inglehart, M. R. (2006). General dentists and pediatric dental patients: the role of dental education. Journal of dental education, 70(12), 1308–1315.
- Richards, P. S., & Inglehart, M. R. (2006). An interdisciplinary approach to case‐based teaching: does it create patient‐centered and culturally sensitive providers?. Journal of dental education, 70(3), 284–291.
