= Stephan Sturm =

German businessman (born 1963)

- Born: 1963 (age 62–63); Worms, Germany
- Education: University of Mannheim
- Occupation: Businessman
- Title: CEO, Fresenius
- Term: 2016–2022
- Predecessor: Ulf Mark Schneider
- Successor: Michael Sen

Stephan Sturm (born 1963) is a German businessman who was the chief executive officer (CEO) of Fresenius from 2016 to 2022.

== Early life ==
Sturm was born in Worms, Germany in 1963. He earned a degree in business administration from the University of Mannheim.

== Career ==
Sturm began his career in 1989 as a management consultant at McKinsey & Company. Subsequently he worked in various positions in the investment banking sector for 13 years, including BHF Bank, UBS and CSFB.

Sturm was chief financial officer (CFO) of Fresenius since January 2005, and succeeded Ulf Mark Schneider as CEO, who had been in the role from May 2003 to June 2016. Sturm initiated the purchase of the Spanish hospital operator Quirónsalud, the largest acquisition in the company's history.

Since 2023, Sturm has been CEO of the Heinz Hermann Thiele Familienstiftung.

== Other activities ==
=== Corporate boards ===
- Hugo Boss, Chair of the Supervisory Board (since 2025)
- Knorr-Bremse, Member of the Supervisory Board (since 2025)
- Fraport, Member of the Economic Advisory Board (since 2016)
- Fresenius Kabi, Chair of the Supervisory Board (since 2016)
- Vamed, Member of the Supervisory Board
- Lufthansa, Member of the Supervisory Board (2016–2021)
- DZ Bank, Member of the Advisory Board (2012)

=== Non-profit organizations ===
- Robert Koch Foundation, Member of the Board of Trustees
- Frankfurt School of Finance & Management Foundation, Member of the Board of Trustees

== Recognition ==
Sturm was named "Chief Financial Officer of the Year 2014" by German Finance magazine.
