= Jürgen Wolters =

German econometrician (1940–2015)

- Born: 24 June 1940; Stuttgart, Württemberg
- Died: 21 November 2015 (aged 75)

Academic background
- Education: University of Mannheim; University of Stuttgart
- Influences: Heinz König

Academic work
- Discipline: Econometrics
- Institutions: Free University of Berlin
- Website: Information at IDEAS / RePEc

Jürgen Wolters (24 June 1940 – 21 November 2015) was a German econometrician specializing in time series analysis. He is a former professor of econometrics at the Free University of Berlin.

Wolters earned his diplom in mathematics from the University of Stuttgart in 1966, and later a doctorate in economics under supervision of Heinz König at the University of Mannheim.

== Selected publications ==
- Benkwitz, Alexander; Lütkepohl, Helmut; ——— (2001). "Comparison of Bootstrap Confidence Intervals for Impulse Responses for German Monetary Systems". Macroeconomic Dynamics. 5 (1): 81–100. doi:10.1017/S1365100501018041. hdl:10419/61726. S2CID 4606180.
- ———; Teräsvirta, Timo; Lütkepohl, Helmut (1998). "Modeling the Demand for M3 in the Unified Germany". Review of Economics and Statistics. 80 (3): 399–409. doi:10.1162/003465398557636. S2CID 57559021.
- Hassler, Uwe; ——— (1995). "Long Memory in Inflation Rates: International Evidence". Journal of Business & Economic Statistics. 13 (1): 37–45. doi:10.1080/07350015.1995.10524577.
- Hassler, Uwe; ——— (1994). "On the Power of Unit Root Tests Against Fractional Alternatives". Economics Letters. 45 (1): 1–5. doi:10.1016/0165-1765(94)90049-3.
