= Sabine Carey =

German political scientist

- Born: 1974 (age 51–52); Germany

Education
- Education: University of North Texas (M.A.), Universität Konstanz (Diplom/M.A.), University of Essex (Ph.D.)

Philosophical work
- Notable works: The Politics of Human Rights (2010, with Mark Gibney and Steven C. Poe), Protest, Repression, and Political Regimes: An Empirical Analysis of Latin America and Sub-Saharan Africa (2009), Understanding Human Rights Violations: New Systematic Studies (2004, edited with Steven C. Poe)
- Website: http://www.sowi.uni-mannheim.de/lspol4/

Sabine C. Carey (born 1974) is a German political scientist.

Sabine C. Carey is currently chair in Political Science IV at Universität Mannheim in Germany. She received master's degrees from the University of North Texas and Universität Konstanz and her Ph.D. from the University of Essex. She previously taught at the University of Nottingham and held a fellowship at the Institute for Quantitative Social Science at Harvard University. She has led a Working Group on Human Rights, Governance, and Conflict at the Peace Research Institute Oslo. Dr. Carey's research focuses primarily on the empirical analysis of various aspects of violent conflict, human rights violations and comparative democratization. She writes specifically about links between governance and repression.

== Prizes, awards, and honors ==
- Associate editor, American Political Science Review, 2016-2019
- Associate editor, Journal of Peace Research, 2011-2017
- Associate editor, International Interactions, 2014-
- Editorial Boards: Journal of Peace Research, International Studies Quarterly, International Interactions, British Journal of Political Science, European Union Politics
- Vice president, International Studies Association, 2011–2012
- Program co-chair, International Studies Association Annual Meeting, 2009
- Grant Recipient: European Research Council, European Commission, Economic and Social Research Council, Leverhulme Trust

== Selected bibliography ==
- The Politics of Human Rights (2010, with Mark Gibney and Steven C. Poe).
- Protest, Repression, and Political Regimes: An Empirical Analysis of Latin America and Sub-Saharan Africa (2009).
- Understanding Human Rights Violations: New Systematic Studies (2004, edited with Steven C. Poe).
- "A Global Analysis of the Effect of Political Regime Changes on Life Integrity Violations, 1977–1993" Journal of Peace Research 37(3) (2000): 213–233.
- "The Dynamic Relationship Between Protest and Repression," Political Research Quarterly 59(1) (2006): 1–11.
- (with Neil J. Mitchell and Will Lowe), "States, the Security Sector, and the Monopoly of Violence: A New Database on Pro-Government Militias," Journal of Peace Research, 50(2) (2013):249-258.
