= Hermann Ude =

German economist

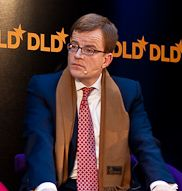
Hermann Ude (2009)

Hermann Ude (born 24 August 1961 in Kiel) is a German economist and a former CEO of international freight transportation provider DHL Global Forwarding, also a former corporate board member of Deutsche Post, from March 2008 until 2011.

From 1982 until 1990 he studied Business Administration and graduated at the Universities of Kiel and Mannheim. After studies he worked as a management consultant for McKinsey & Company in the automotive, assembly and electronics industry.

Hermann Ude continued his career with Deutsche Post as head of the corporate center in 1998. He worked there on a number of restructuring and reorganization projects. In 2004, his previous positions were combined when he became responsible for a number of large projects namely the pre-merger integration workstream for the acquisition of Exel. In 2005 he became responsible for the First Choice Service initiative, the group's 6-sigma program. In 2006 he was appointed CEO of DHL Freight, the EUR 3.5 bn roadfreight division of DHL. When former Deutsche Post CEO Klaus Zumwinkel resigned in 2008, Ude was appointed to the board of Deutsche Post DHL and CEO of the EUR 14 bn DHL Global Forwarding Division. Although he almost doubled the results of his division Ude stepped down from his mandate in 2011 amid diverging views on the future focus of the company.

Since 2012 he works as Managing Partner of Transport Transparency GmbH and is engaged in the education industry.

Prior to the German federal election, 2013 in summer, German press reported that Hermann Ude allegedly tried to coerce Peer Steinbrück, the social-democratic candidate for the German chancellorship. Only days after the election the attorney closed the investigation initiated by Steinbrück as no indication for an offence could be found.
