= Wolfgang Franz (economist) =

German economist

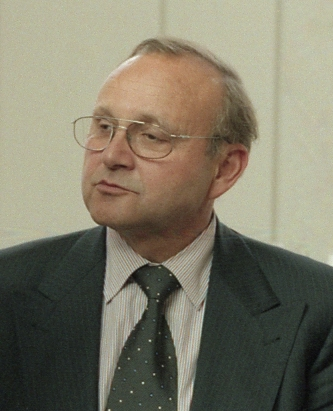
- Born: 7 January 1944 (age 82); Nassau an der Lahn, Germany

Academic background
- Education: University of Mannheim
- Influences: Heinz König

Academic work
- Discipline: Labor economics Macroeconomics
- Institutions: University of Mannheim
- Website: Information at IDEAS / RePEc

Wolfgang Franz (born 7 January 1944) is a German economist. He is Professor of Economics at the University of Mannheim. Franz also is the chairman of the German Council of Economic Experts since March 2009.

== Career ==
Franz studied economics at the University of Mannheim and received his doctoral degree in 1974, under supervision of Heinz König. He held positions at the University of Mainz, the University of Stuttgart, and the University of Konstanz, before returning to University of Mannheim in 1997.

Franz's research interests include labor markets, macroeconomics and empirical analysis of economics.

== Other activities ==
- Bruegel, Member of the Board
- Landesbank Baden-Württemberg (LBBW), Member of the advisory board (2007–2008)
- German Council for Sustainable Development (RNE), Member (2001–2004, appointed ad personam by Chancellor Gerhard Schröder)
