= Ulrich Steinvorth =

German political philosopher (born 1941)

- Born: 1941 (age 84–85)
- Occupation: Political philosopher

Ulrich Steinvorth (born 1941) is a German political philosopher. He earned his doctorate with Günther Patzig in 1967. His dissertation was on private language and sensation in Wittgenstein. He habilitated in 1975 at the University of Mannheim with a thesis that advanced an analytic interpretation of Marx's Dialectic ("An Analytic Interpretation of Marx's Dialectic"). His primary field of research is political philosophy. Additionally, he has published on topics in moral philosophy and applied philosophy, as well as the history of philosophy and metaphysics. He has also been an active supporter of the German branch of the Creative Commons movement.

Until his retirement in 2006, he held posts at various German universities. From 1968 to 1977, he was assistant professor at the University of Mannheim; from 1977 to 1980, he was professor of philosophy at the University of Osnabrueck; from 1980 to 1982, he was professor of philosophy at the University of Düsseldorf; from 1982 to 2006, he was a professor of philosophy at the University of Hamburg. From 2006 to 2011, he was a visiting professor at Bilkent University (Ankara), from 2011 to 2012 at the University of Tokyo and from 2012 to 2013 at George Mason University.

== Books ==
- 1975 Eine analytische Interpretation der Marxschen Dialektik. Hain, Meisenheim am Glan
- 1981 Stationen der politischen Theorie: Hobbes, Locke, Rousseau, Kant, Hegel, Marx, Weber. Reclam, Stuttgart
- 1987 Freiheitstheorien in der Philosophie der Neuzeit. WBG, Darmstadt.
- 1990 Klassische und moderne Ethik. Grundlinien einer materialen Moraltheorie. Rowohlt, Reinbek
- 1994 Warum überhaupt etwas ist. Kleine demiurgische Metaphysik. Rowohlt, Reinbek
- 1999 Gleiche Freiheit. Politische Philosophie und Verteilungsgerechtigkeit. Akademie Verlag, Berlin
- 2002 Was ist Vernunft? Eine philosophische Einführung. Beck, München
- 2004 Éthique classique et éthique moderne. Ed. L'Harmattan, Paris
- 2006 Docklosigkeit. Oder zur Metaphysik der Moderne. mentis, Paderborn
- 2009 Rethinking the Western Understanding of the Self. Cambridge University Press, New York
- 2013 The Metaphysics of Modernity. What Makes Societies Thrive. Marquette University Press, Milwaukee
- 2016 Pride and Authenticity. Palgrave Macmillan, New York
- 2017 Secularization. An Essay in Normative Metaphysics. Palgrave Macmillan, New York
- 2020 A Secular Absolute. How Modern Philosophy Discovered Authenticity. Palgrave Macmillan, New York
- 2021 A Plea for Naturalistic Metaphysics. Why Analytic Metaphysics is Not Enough. Palgrave Macmillan, New York
- 2023 Unterdrückung durch Beglückung. Eine liberale Revision der politischen Philosophie. Meiner, Hamburg

Edited works and translations

- 1968 Über Ludwig Wittgenstein. Suhrkamp, Frankfurt
- 1971 Russell, Bertrand: Philosophische und politische Aufsätze. Reclam, Stuttgart
- 1998 with Margit E. Oswald: Die offene Gesellschaft und ihre Fremden. Huber, Bern
- 2002 with Reinold Schmücker: Gerechtigkeit und Politik. Philosophische Perspektiven. Akademie Verlag, Berlin
- 2014 From Capitalistic to Humanistic Business (Humanism in Business Series), Palgrave Macmillan: New York (edited with Michael Pirson, Carlos Largacha-Martinez, Claus Dierksmeyer)

Papers (selection)

- 1977 Determinismus, Freiheit und Moral. In: Kant-Studien 68, pp. 478–492
- 1979 Modellkonstruktion und empirische Überprüfbarkeit in Marx' Kapital In: Analyse & Kritik 1, pp. 164–181
- 1980 Lakatos und politische Theorie In: Zeitschrift für allgemeine Wissenschaftstheorie 11, pp. 135–146
- 1982 Max Webers System der verstehenden Soziologie In: Zeitschrift für allgemeine Wissenschaftstheorie 13, pp. 48–69
- 1985 Harald Delius´Analyse des Selbstbewußtseins In: Allgemeine Zeitschrift für Philosopie 10, pp. 41–61
- 1986 Über die Rolle von Vertrag und Konsens in der politischen Theorie In: Archiv für Rechts-und Sozialphilosophie 72, pp. 21–31
- 1991 Macht oder Metaphysik In: Analyse und Kritik 13, pp. 155–169; Wie eine Moralbegründung aussehen könnte In: Deutsche Zeitschrift für Philosophie 39, pp. 879–889
- 1993 Menschenrechte und Sozialstaat In: Rechtsphilosophische Hefte 1, pp. 9–21
- 1994 Zur Begründung der Befugnis des Rechts zu zwingen In: Logos, N.F. 1. pp. 321–333; Brauchen wir einen Nationalismus? In: Rechtsphilosophische Hefte 3, pp. 77–102
- 1995 Steiner's justice In: Analyse und Kritik 17, pp. 21–34; Experimente mit Embryonen? In: Logos, N.F. 2, pp. 406–432; Zum Problem der Willensfreiheit. In: Zeitschrift für philosophische Forschung 49, pp. 398–415
- 1996 Das Recht auf Arbeit In: Rechtsphilosophische Hefte 5, pp. 77–95
- 1997 Menschenrechte in Asien In: Rechtsphilosophische Hefte 9, pp. 7–17
- 1998 The curse of mankind In: Ethical theory and practice 1, pp. 467–475
- 2000 Kann das Grundeinkommen die Arbeitslosigkeit abbauen? In: Analyse und Kritik 22, pp. 257–268
- 2004 In welchem Sinn hat der Mensch einen freien Willen? In: F. Hermanni und P. Koslowski (Hrsg.): Der freie und der unfreie Wille. In: Philosophische und theologische Perspektiven. Fink, München pp. 1–17
- 2005 Willensfreiheit. In: Ethik & Unterricht 16, 2, pp. 11–15
- 2007 Wittgenstein über den Willen und die Ontologie der Philosophischen Untersuchungen In: Wittgenstein Studien 13; Wozu Philosophie? In: Zeitschrift für Didaktik der Philosophie und Ethik 29, pp. 46–53; Was sind Nationen und in welchem Verhältnis stehen sie zueinander? Eine Kritik der Theorie von Rawls und ein Gegenentwurf. In: Rechtsphilosophische Hefte 12, pp. 33–54; Generationengerechtigkeit In: Journal für Generationengerechtigkeit 7, H. 4, pp. 12–15; Philosophie und Lebenskunst. Aufklärung und Kritik In: Sonderheft Nr. 14, Hg. Robert Zimmer, Glück und Lebenskunst, pp. 8–28
- 2008 On Critical Theory In: Analyse und Kritik 30, pp. 399–423
- 2009 The Right to Work and the Right to Develop One’s Capabilities In: Analyse und Kritik, pp. 101–113
- 2009 Reason and Will in the Idea for a Universal History and the Groundwork In: J.-C. Heilinger et al. (Hrsg.): Individualität und Selbstbestimmung. Festschrift für Volker Gerhardt. Akademie Verlag, Berlin pp. 143–155
- 2010 Marx and Humanism In: Humanistic Ethics in the Age of Globality, ed. by Claus Dierksmeier, Wolfgang Amann, Ernst von Klimakowitz, Heiko Spitzeck and Michael Pirson, Basingstoke (Palgrave Macmillan) 2011 (Series: Humanism in Business)
- 2012 Universalism In: M. Kirloskar-Steinbach/G. Dharampal-Frick/M. Friele (eds.), Die Interkulturalitätsdebatte - Leit- und Streitbegriffe/Intercultural Discourse - Key and Contested Concepts, Freiburg: Herder 2012, 56-64
- 2023 Tugendhat über Moralbegründung, Mystik und Religion. Deutsche Zeitschrift für Philosophie 2023, 1-29
