= Rosemarie Tracy =

German linguist

Rosemarie Tracy is a German linguist specializing in language acquisition. She is currently senior professor of English linguistics at the University of Mannheim.

== Biography ==
Tracy studied English, French and Portuguese at the universities of Mannheim and Göttingen, as well as Bryn Mawr College. She received her doctorate at the University of Mannheim in 1991 for a thesis on child first language acquisition based on longitudinal studies (published as Tracy 1991).

Subsequently, she taught and researched at the University of Heidelberg and the University of Göttingen, taking a habilitation for her work on bilingual child language acquisition. She was appointed professor of English linguistics at Mannheim in 1995. After her retirement in 2019, she was appointed Senior Professor by the University of Mannheim.

== Honors ==
A special issue of Zeitschrift für Sprachwissenschaft in her honor was published in 2017.

In 2022 she was awarded the Wilhelm von Humboldt Prize for lifetime achievement by the German Linguistics Society (DGfS).

== Research and outreach ==
Tracy's research revolves around language acquisition and psycholinguistics, and she has published widely on topics such as code-switching, borrowing, and language change at the individual level. She has led projects funded by the German Research Council on comparing monolingual and bilingual acquisition and on German as a heritage language in the US. She is one of the founders of the MAZEM – Mannheim Center for Empirical Multilingual Research.

She is the author of an influential popular book, How children learn languages (German: Wie Kinder Sprachen lernen), written for parents of multilingual children, teachers, and early-years educators.

== Publications ==
- Tracy, Rosemarie. 1986. The acquisition of case morphology in German. Linguistics 24 (1), 47–78. doi:10.1515/ling.1986.24.1.47
- Fritzenschaft, Agnes, Ira Gawlitzek-Maiwald, Rosemarie Tracy, and Susanne Winkler. 1990. Wege zur komplexen Syntax (Routes to complex syntax). Zeitschrift für Sprachwissenschaft 9 (1-2), 52–134. doi:10.1515/zfsw.1990.9.1-2.52
- Tracy, Rosemarie. 1991. Sprachliche Strukturentwicklung: linguistische und kognitionspsychologische Aspekte einer Theorie des Erstspracherwerbs. (The development of structure in language: linguistic and cognitive-psychological aspects of a theory of first language acquisition.) Tübingen: Gunter Narr Verlag. ISBN 9783823347118
- Gawlitzek-Maiwald, Ira, Rosemarie Tracy, and Agnes Fritzenschaft. 1992. Language Acquisition and Competing Linguistic Representations: The Child as Arbiter. In Jürgen M. Meisel (ed.), The Acquisition of Verb Placement: Functional Categories and V2 Phenomena in Language Acquisition, 139–179. Dordrecht: Kluwer. doi:10.1007/978-94-011-2803-2_6
- Gawlitzek-Maiwald, Ira, and Rosemarie Tracy. 1996. Bilingual bootstrapping. Linguistics 34 (5), 901–926. doi:10.1515/ling.1996.34.5.901
- Tracy, Rosemarie. 2008. Wie Kinder Sprachen lernen: und wie wir sie dabei unterstützen können (How children learn languages and how we can support them). Second edition. Tübingen: Francke Verlag. ISBN 9783772083068
