= Zentrum für Europäische Wirtschaftsforschung =

Economic research institute

Coordinates: 49.4819°N 8.4658°E

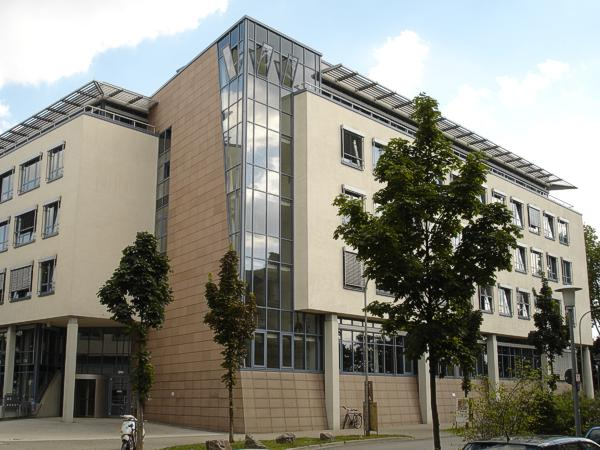
ZEW headquarters in Mannheim

The ZEW - Leibniz Centre for European Economic Research in Mannheim is an economic research institute in the Gottfried Wilhelm Leibniz Science Association (WGL). It is headed by President Achim Wambach and Managing Director Claudia von Schuttenbach. According to the RePEc ranking, ZEW is one of the leading European economic research institutes. Currently, ZEW has 189 employees, 115 of whom are scientists (as of December 31, 2023).

== History ==
ZEW was founded in 1990 and scientific work began on April 1, 1991. The founding directors were Heinz König, Scientific Director, and Ernst-O. Schulze, commercial director. In 2005, the research institute became a member of the Leibniz Association. From 1997 to 2013, Wolfgang Franz was president of ZEW. He was succeeded by Clemens Fuest. Achim Wambach took over as president in April 2016.

== Structure and Objectives ==
In organizational terms, ZEW is divided into seven research areas:

- Pensions and Sustainable Financial Markets
- Labour Markets and Social Insurance
- Digital Economy
- Economics of Innovation and Industrial Dynamics
- Market Design
- Environmental and Climate Economics
- Corporate Taxation and Public Finance

And two research groups:

- Health Care Markets and Health Policy
- Inequality and Public Policy

ZEW pursues two central goals with its research:

- Politically relevant research
- Science-based policy advice

The overarching guiding research principle at ZEW is the economic analysis and design of functioning markets and institutions in Europe. The ZEW's expertise lies particularly in the field of applied microeconometrics and computable general equilibrium models. On the one hand, ZEW scientists communicate their research results at scientific conferences and in scientific journals. On the other hand, they also pass them on to the public through studies, publication series and further education events.

Particular attention is paid to the ZEW's monthly "ZEW Indicator of Economic Sentiment". They are an important early indicator for economic development in Germany. However, the expectations for the Eurozone, Japan, Great Britain and the USA are also surveyed.

== Funding and Committees ==
=== Funding ===
The ZEW is financed for the most part by funds from the state of Baden-Württemberg and, since 2005, by federal and state funding; this institutional funding amounted to 63% in 2023. Third-party funding (including "other income") accounted for 33%. The remaining 4% are reserves. The Institute's third-party funding derives 56% from the federal government and foreign ministries, 10% from the federal states, 23% from foundations, the German Research Foundation (DFG) and scientific institutions, 10% from companies and associations and 1% from institutions of the European Union.

=== Supervisory Board ===
- Chairman: Hans Reiter
- Vice-Chairman: Ralf Krieger
- Other members: Elga Bartsch, Heiko Engling, Natalia Jaekel, Michael Kleiner, Ingrid Ott, Ines Ploss, Thomas Puhl, Albrecht Schütte, and Peter Winker

=== Scientific Advisory Board ===
- Chairman: Kai Konrad
- Vice-Chairman: Nadine Riedel
- Other members: Özlem Bedre-Defolie, Jakob de Haan, Ottmar Edenhofer, Bernd Fitzenberger, Dietmar Harhoff, Axel Ockenfels, Jörg Rocholl, Monika Schnitzer, Leonie Sundmacher, and Massimo Tavoni

== Building in L7 Mannheim ==
The urban design was developed by the Mannheim architectural firm #Carlfried Mutschler und Partner Joachim Langner, Christine Mäurer and Ludwig Schwöbel. The architectural design was developed by the successor office of Ludwig Schwöbel and Christine Mäurer. The building received the Good Building Award from the Association of German Architects BDA and the Exemplary Building Award from the Baden-Württemberg Chamber of Architects. It is published in the book series Mannheim und seine Bauten 1907 - 2007, Volume 3, and in the architectural guide Mannheim.
