= Peter Flora =

Austrian academic

Peter Flora (*3 March 1944, in Innsbruck, Alpine and Danube Reichsgaue, Greater German Reich) is an Austrian citizen and taught until his retirement in spring 2009 as a professor of sociology at the University of Mannheim. Flora is a son of the Austrian drawer, caricaturist, graphic artist and illustrator Paul Flora.

== Academic career ==
Flora attended primary and secondary school in Innsbruck. At 21 years he started his studies studying sociology, political science and statistics at the Universities of Tübingen, Berlin, and finally Konstanz in sociology, political science and statistics (from 1965 to 1969). He concluded his studies in 1969 (aged 25 years old) with a Master of Arts degree from the University of Konstanz. His MA thesis dealt with Proposals in Order to Determine the Term and the Investigation of the Phenomenon of Conservatism.

=== The modernization researcher ===
Flora's years as an assistant from 1969 to 1973, he completed at the Universities of Frankfurt and Mannheim at the chair of Prof. Dr. Wolfgang Zapf; both together organized the QUAM-project (Quantitative Model of Modernization). Based on data collected in this project, he received a doctorate in 1972 at the University of Constance on a subject which would occupy him as well as his supervisor Wolfgang Zapf for many years: modernization research. The doctoral dissertation was published in 1974 and 1975 respectively in two parts with the Westdeutscher Verlag.

In 1972, when Zapf accepted the professorship of the third chair for sociology (Lehrstuhl für Soziologie III) at the University of Mannheim, Flora moved with him as assistant to Mannheim. Both together applied for the project on Historical Indicators of the Western European Democracies (HIWED) which became funded by the VolkswagenStiftung. Results of this research project consisted of a larger number of presentations, contributions to journals and books, the working paper series of the HIWED-Reports, two dissertations and finally the two-volume data handbook State, Economy, and Society in Western Europe 1815–1975, published in 1983 and 1987 respectively.

Only three years after receiving his doctoral degree, in 1976 at the age of 32, Flora qualified for lecturing in sociology at the University of Mannheim with a habilitation thesis on Modernization and the Development of the European Welfare States. Expert opinions were delivered by M. Rainer Lepsius and Wolfgang Zapf.

In the same year, Flora attained a C 3 professorship for sociology at the Research Institute for Sociology of the University of Cologne; there he taught and did research until 1979. The HIWED project was continued by a research project funded by the VolkswagenStiftung in order to build up the so-called West European Data Archive (WEDA). The general goal was to produce a historical data handbook on Western Europe, the theory of Stein Rokkan forming the background, and a series of data-supported analyses on the modernization of West European societies which should pick up and develop further Rokkan's ideas.

=== The welfare state researcher ===
In the HIWED project the analysis of redistribution processes by the welfare state played a central role. After Flora had received a call by the European University Institute (EUI) in Florence (Italy) in 1979, the expansion of the West European welfare states after World War II moved to the foreground of a large comparative research project titled: Growth to Limits: The Western European Welfare States Since World War II. When consciously reversing the title of the famous book Limits to Growth by Donella H. Meadows and Dennis L. Meadows, published in 1972, not only a gimmick in order to create publicity was found, but the central hypothesis of the project was formulated as well: with the extension of the catalogue of life risks secured by the welfare state, and the comprehensive inclusion of almost all population groups in the welfare state programs, the welfare state has attained its limit of extension and ends in a phase of consolidation. Among Flora's most important collaborators in this project, carried through in Florence with numerous doctoral candidates from the member states of the European Union, was mainly Jens Alber, who had already collaborated with him in the HIWED project.

In 1982, Peter Flora accepted a call by the Faculty for Social Sciences of the University of Mannheim, to become the successor of M. Rainer Lepsius. In his lectures, he predominantly represented and read on topics of macrosociology and the comparative study of European societies. But one of his central achievements is institution formation i.e. the setting up of the Mannheim Centre for Social Sciences.

=== The scientific entrepreneur ===
Flora aimed at giving comparative macrosociology, based on official statistics, a systematic basis, a basis which comparative survey research already had received by the way of diverse archives and Summer Schools. His vision was to establish a centre which could become a permanent basis for European-comparative data collection and data processing. Thus, he responsibly wrote an application in order to establish a Mannheim Centre for the Social Sciences which was set up since 1989 by means from the Government of the Land Baden-Württemberg. From 1989 to 1993, Flora acted as founding director of the Mannheim Centre for European Social Research (MZES) of today and accomplished here the decisive pioneering work. The main organizational emphasis was placed on the establishment of a European Library, an electronic data processing unit, and of the European Data Archive. From 1996 to 1998 he completed a second time period as director. The West European Data Archive (WEDA), later renamed Research Archive Eurodata, became part of the MZES as an infrastructural department. This archive should document and perpetuate the time series data collections from the HIWED and Growth to Limits projects. At the same time, the archive was intended to support research projects at the MZES. From 1995 to 2002/03, the archive published its own Eurodata-Newsletter.

Flora's goal was to permanently institutionalize the monitoring of the welfare state (in the sense of social reporting). Related to this aim, a series of research projects on the West European welfare state were planned, such as: continuation of the Growth to Limits project, the welfare state of different social categories, such as the farmers (Elmar Rieger), the public employees (Franz Rothenbacher), etc. In addition, comparative projects were developed and organized for selected types of welfare state activities, such as Old Age and Old Age Protection (Jürgen Kohl) and Families and Family Policies (Peter Flora, Alfred J. Kahn, Sheila B. Kamerman). Finally, data collections should be regionalized by the way of a European Social Atlas.

=== The Rokkanian ===
Among Flora's early goals was the edition of the writings of his model, of the far too early deceased Norwegian Stein Rokkan. But the idea to publish the collected works of Rokkan was given up, with respect to the fact that Rokkan's publications hid many duplications. Thus, supported by his colleagues Stein Kuhnle and Derek Urwin, they decided to reconstruct from Rokkan's scientific work the essentials of his theory of Europe and to bundle them in the sense of a theory of European state and nation formation. In order to achieve this goal, first all publications of Rokkan's publications were collected and made machine-readable by scanning them (building what is today the Stein Rokkan-archive), with the intention to produce a summarizing book (State Formation, Nation-Building, and Mass Politics in Europe: The Theory of Stein Rokkan. Based on his collected works. Edited by Peter Flora, 1999). This book was first published in English language; afterwards it was translated into the German by Elisabeth Fix and into the Italian by Daniele Caramani. The German pocket book edition, published by Suhrkamp, is a good seller.

== Teaching, research, administration—organization ==
=== Teaching ===
In his teachings, Peter Flora, being a representative of macrosociology and historical sociology, mainly devoted himself to the comparative analysis of European societies, with an emphasis on historical-genetic analysis. Single lectures and courses were titled such as: Analysis of the social structure of Europe, State and nation building, or The European welfare state.

=== Research projects ===
The list of the research projects stimulated by Peter Flora or carried out by himself (with co-researchers) is long.

- During the transition from the 1960s to the 1970s, in cooperation with Wolfgang Zapf, Flora conducted the QUAM-project (Quantitative Model of Modernization) at the University of Frankfurt; results were his doctoral dissertation and furthermore several comparative analyses in English language.
- Historical Indicators of Western European Democracies (HIWED), research application still together with Wolfgang Zapf (results: data handbook, dissertations by Jens Alber and Jürgen Kohl, HIWED Working Papers).
- Growth to Limits (results: 3 volumes).
- Family Change and Family Policies in the West (results: 1 volume for the Anglo-Saxon countries Canada, New Zealand and United States (Sheila B. Kamerman and Alfred J. Kahn); and additional country studies on: a. the Consociational Democracies: Belgium, Switzerland, The Netherlands. b. France and Southern Europe: France, Greece, Italy, Portugal, Spain. c. Central Europe: Austria, the Germanies, Hungary, Poland. d. the Scandinavian welfare states: Denmark, Finland, Iceland, Norway, Sweden).

=== Administration—organization ===
In his long career, Peter Flora has organized a large number of meetings and conferences. One of the most important ones for the MZES was the conference on The New Europe of the Committee on Political Sociology of IPSA and ISA held at the MZES in Mannheim from 21 to 23 February 1991.

Participants in this conference were: Peter Flora, Shmuel N. Eisenstadt, Juan Linz, Erik Allardt, Richard Rose, Seymour Martin Lipset, Mattei Dogan, Philippe C. Schmitter, Bernd Schulte, Peter Graf von Kielmansegg, Klaus von Beyme, Stein Ugelvik Larsen, Wlodzimierz Wesolowski, M. Rainer Lepsius, Stein Kuhnle, Wolfgang Streeck, Max Kaase, Franz Urban Pappi, and Hans-Dieter Klingemann.

== Memberships ==
From 1979 to 1982 Peter Flora was editor of the Zeitschrift für Soziologie.

From 1987 to 1993 he was Chairman of the Committee on Political Sociology of the International Political Science Association (IPSA) and the International Sociological Association (ISA).

Since 1999 he is a member of the Academia Europaea.

== Importance ==
Peter Flora belongs to the fathers of the renaissance of comparative historical sociology based on macrodata. In Germany he has contributed decisively to redirect German sociology from its occupation with the own nation during the 1970s towards a comparative and European perspective. The systematic comparison of societies in a historical perspective has received decisive impulses from his publications, by his activities in official positions of the sociological profession and as academic teacher, and furthermore by his pioneering role when establishing the Mannheim Centre for European Social Research.

== Works ==
=== Books (author, co-author) ===
- Vorschläge zur Bestimmung des Begriffs und zur Untersuchung des Phänomens "Konservatismus". 2 Teile. Universität Konstanz, Magisterarbeit, 1969.
- Modernisierungsforschung: Zur empirischen Analyse der gesellschaftlichen Entwicklung. Studien zur Sozialwissenschaft, Bd. 20. Opladen: Westdeutscher Verlag, 1974.
- Indikatoren der Modernisierung: Ein historisches Datenhandbuch. Studien zur Sozialwissenschaft, Bd. 27. Opladen: Westdeutscher Verlag, 1975.
- Quantitative Historical Sociology: A Trend Report and Bibliography. Current Sociology (The Hague and Paris: Mouton, 1977) XXIII/2, pp. 1–249.
- State, Economy, and Society in Western Europe 1815–1975: A Data Handbook in two Volumes. Frankfurt, New York: Campus; London: Macmillan Press; Chicago: St. James Press.
  - Volume I: The Growth of Mass Democracies and Welfare States. 1983 (together with Jens Alber, Richard Eichenberg, Jürgen Kohl, Franz Kraus, Winfried Pfenning, and Kurt Seebohm).
  - Volume II: The Growth of Industrial Societies and Capitalist Economies. 1987 (together with Franz Kraus and Winfried Pfenning).

=== Books (editor) ===
- The Development of Welfare States in Europe and America. New Brunswick, US und London, UK: Transaction Books, 1981. 6th paperback reprint 2003 (together with Arnold Heidenheimer).
- Growth to Limits: The Western European Welfare States Since World War II. 3 vols. Berlin, New York: Walter de Gruyter.
  - Volume 1: Sweden, Norway, Finland, Denmark. 1986.
  - Volume 2: Germany, United Kingdom, Ireland, Italy. 1986.
  - Volume 4: Appendix (Synopses, Bibliographies, Tables). 1987.
- Social Statistics and Social Reporting in and for Europe. Bonn: Informationszentrum Sozialwissenschaften, 1994. (Europe in Comparison: A Series of Guidebooks for the Social Sciences, vol. 1) (together with Franz Kraus, Heinz-Herbert Noll and Franz Rothenbacher).
- The State of Social Welfare, 1997: International Studies on Social Insurance and Retirement, Employment, Family Policy and Health Care. International Studies on Social Security, vol. 4. Aldershot: Ashgate, 1998 (ed., together with Philip R. de Jong, Julian Le Grand, and Jun-Young Kim). Cf. "Introduction and Overview", pp. xi–xiv (together with the other editors).
- Sozialberichterstattung und Sozialstaatsbeobachtung: Individuelle Wohlfahrt und wohlfahrtsstaatliche Institutionen im Spiegel empirischer Analysen. Frankfurt a.M., New York: Campus, 1999 (together with Heinz-Herbert Noll).
- State Formation, Nation-Building, and Mass Politics in Europe: The Theory of Stein Rokkan. Based on his collected works. Edited by Peter Flora with Stein Kuhnle and Derek Urwin. Oxford: Oxford University Press, 1999.
- Staat, Nation und Demokratie in Europa: Die Theorie Stein Rokkans. Aus seinen gesammelten Werken rekonstruiert und eingeleitet von Peter Flora. Suhrkamp-Taschenbuch Wissenschaft, Bd. 1473. Frankfurt a.M.: Suhrkamp, 2000. Reprint 2006 (translation of State Formation, Nation-Building, and Mass Politics in Europe: The Theory of Stein Rokkan. Based on his collected works. Translated from the English by Elisabeth Fix).

=== Series editor ===
- Historical Indicators of the Western European Democracies (HIWED). Reports. No. 1–10, 1975–1979. Mannheim: Fakultät für Sozialwissenschaften; Universität zu Köln: Forschungsinstitut für Soziologie.
- Europäische Sozialwissenschaftliche Studien. European Social Science Studies. Frankfurt a.M., New York: Campus. 2 vols. 1982 (Jens Alber) and 1984 (Jürgen Kohl).
- Europe in Comparison: A Series of Guidebooks for the Social Sciences (together with Heinrich Best). Bonn: Informationszentrum Sozialwissenschaften; Mannheim: Mannheimer Zentrum für Europäische Sozialforschung. Vols. 1–6, 1994–1998.
- EURODATA Newsletter. No. 1–16/17, Spring 1995–Autumn/Spring 2002/2003 (appeared semi-annually; from No. 12/13, Autumn/Spring 2000/1 annually as double no.) (together with Franz Kraus and Franz Rothenbacher).
- International Studies on Social Security. Aldershot et al.: Ashgate. Vol. 1, 1996– (Chief Series Editor).
- Family Change and Family Policies in the West: A Series of Country Studies and Comparative Analyses Examining Major Changes in the Family and the Broad Spectrum of Family Policies in Western Industrial Society in the Second Half of the Twentieth Century. Oxford: Clarendon Press (together with Sheila B. Kamerman and Alfred J. Kahn). Vol. 1, 1997.
- The Societies of Europe: A Series of Historical Data Handbooks. Houndmills, Basingstoke, Hampshire, UK und New York, US: Palgrave Macmillan, 2000ff (together with Franz Kraus and Franz Rothenbacher).
  - Vol. 1: Daniele Caramani, Elections in Western Europe since 1815. 2000. Reprint 2004.
  - Vol. 2: Bernhard Ebbinghaus und Jelle Visser, Trade Unions in Western Europe since 1945. 2000. Reprint 2004.
  - Vol. 3: Franz Rothenbacher, The European Population 1850–1945. 2002. Reprint 2006.
  - Vol. 4: Franz Rothenbacher, The European Population since 1945. 2005. Reprint 2006.
  - Vol. 5: Franz Rothenbacher, The Central and East European Population since 1850. 2013.

=== Articles in journals and books ===
- Some Problems of Time-series Analysis in Modernization Research. International Political Science Association, VIII World Congress Munich. Aug. 31–Sept. 5, 1970; Topic: Political Modernization; Paper. Paris: IPSA, 1970. 46 pp. (with Wolfgang Zapf).
- Some Problems of Time-series Analysis in Research on Modernization. Social Science Information 10 (3) (1971): 53–102 (with Wolfgang Zapf).
- Differences in Path of Development: An Analysis for Ten Countries. In: S. N. Eisenstadt und S. Rokkan (eds.): Building States and Nations: Models and Data Resources. Vol. I. Beverly Hills and London: Sage 1973, 161–211 (reprint of "Some Problems of Time-series Analysis in Research on Modernization". Social Science Information 10 (3) (1971): 53–102) (with Wolfgang Zapf).
- Zeitreihen als Indikatoren der Modernisierung: Einige Probleme der Datensammlung und Datenanalyse. Politische Vierteljahresschrift 12,1 (1971): 29–70 (German translation of "Some Problems of Time-series Analysis in Research on Modernization". Social Science Information 10 (3) (1971): 53–102) (with Wolfgang Zapf).
- Historische Prozesse sozialer Mobilisierung, Urbanisierung und Alphabetisierung, 1850–1965. Zeitschrift für Soziologie 1 (2) (1972): 85–117.
- Ein Exempel aus deutscher Provinz. Zeitschrift für Soziologie 1 (4) (Oktober 1972): 379–384.
- Historical Processes of Social Mobilization, Urbanization and Literacy, 1850–1965. In: S. N. Eisenstadt und S. Rokkan (eds.): Building States and Nations: Models and Data Resources. Vol. I. Beverly Hills and London: Sage 1973, 213–258.
- Die Bildungsentwicklung im Prozess der Staaten- und Nationenbildung. In: P.C. Ludz (ed.): Soziologie und Sozialgeschichte. Kölner Zeitschrift für Soziologie und Sozialpsychologie special no. 16 (1973): 194–319.
- A New Stage of Political Arithmetic. The Journal of Conflict Resolution 18 (1) (1974): 143–165.
- Peter Flora, Jens Alber and Jürgen Kohl: Zur Entwicklung der westeuropäischen Wohlfahrtsstaaten. Politische Vierteljahresschrift 18 (4) (1977): 707–772.
- Krisenbewältigung oder Krisenerzeugung? Der Wohlfahrtsstaat in historischer Perspektive. In: Joachim Matthes (ed.): Sozialer Wandel in Westeuropa: Verhandlungen des 19. Deutschen Soziologentages 17.–20. April 1979 im Internationalen Congress Centrum (ICC) in Berlin. Frankfurt a.M., New York: Campus, 1979, 82–136.
- Stein Rokkan †: Eine Familie von Modellen für die vergleichende Geschichte Europas, ed. by Peter Flora. Zeitschrift für Soziologie 9 (2) (1980): 118–128.
- Stein Rokkan-Bibliographie. Zeitschrift für Soziologie 9 (2) (1980): 129–131.
- Solution or Source of Crisis? The Welfare State in Historical Perspective. In: Wolfgang Mommsen (ed.): The Emergence of the Welfare State in Britain and Germany:1850–1950. London: Croom Helm, 1981 (reprint 1983), 343–389.
- Stein Rokkans Makro-Modell der politischen Entwicklung Europas: Ein Rekonstruktionsversuch. Kölner Zeitschrift für Soziologie und Sozialpsychologie 33 (3) (1981): 397–436.
- The Historical Core and Changing Boundaries of the Welfare State. In: Peter Flora and Arnold Heidenheimer (eds.): The Development of Welfare States in Europe and America. New Brunswick, US und London, UK: Transaction Books, 1981 and more often, 17–34 (with Arnold Heidenheimer).
- Modernization, Democratization, and the Development of Welfare States in Western Europe. In: Peter Flora and Arnold Heidenheimer (eds.): The Development of Welfare States in Europe and America. New Brunswick, US und London, UK: Transaction Books, 1981. 6th paperback reprint 2003, 37–80 (with Jens Alber).
- Krisenbewältigung oder Krisenerzeugung? Der Wohlfahrtsstaat in historischer Perspektive. In: Wolfgang J. Mommsen (ed.): Die Entstehung des Wohlfahrtsstaates in Großbritannien und Deutschland 1850–1950. ed. by Wolfgang J. Mommsen in co-operation with Wolfgang Mock (Veröffentlichungen des Deutschen Historischen Instituts London, Bd. 11). 1st ed. Stuttgart: Klett-Cotta, 1982, 353–398.
- From Industrial to Postindustrial Welfare State? The Journal of Social Science XLI no. 1 (1989). Institute of Social Science, University of Tokyo.
- Die Westeuropäische Gesellschaft im Übergang. In: Elfriede Regelsberger and Maurizio Ferrera (ed.), Italien und die Bundesrepublik Deutschland — Antriebskräfte der europäischen Integration: Ergebnisse des Deutsch-Italienischen Gesprächsforums 1989. Bonn: Europa Union Verlag, 1990, 197–207.
- Die soziale Dimension der europäischen Integration: externe Grenzbildung und interne Strukturierung—Zusammenfassung. In: Wolfgang Zapf (ed.): Die Modernisierung moderner Gesellschaften. Verhandlungen des 25. Deutschen Soziologentages in Frankfurt am Main 1990. Frankfurt a.M., New York: Campus, 1991, 357–360.
- Mannheimer Zentrum für Europäische Sozialforschung. In: Joachim Schild (ed.): Länderforschung, Ländervergleich und Europäische Integration. Ludwigsburg: Deutsch-Französisches Institut (Neue Ludwigsburger Beiträge; no. 1 (1991)).
- Europa als Sozialstaat? In: Bernhard Schäfers (ed.): Lebensverhältnisse und soziale Konflikte im neuen Europa. Verhandlungen 26. Deutschen Soziologentages in Düsseldorf 1992. Frankfurt a.M., New York: Campus, 1993, 754–762.
- A System of Socio-Economic Reporting on Europe: Memorandum for the Fifth Framework Programme of the EU. EURODATA Newsletter No. 5 (Spring 1997): 2–7.
- Die Perspektive einer Sozialstaatsbeobachtung. In: Peter Flora and Heinz-Herbert Noll (eds.): Sozialberichterstattung und Sozialstaatsbeobachtung: Individuelle Wohlfahrt und wohlfahrtsstaatliche Institutionen im Spiegel empirischer Analysen. Frankfurt a.M., New York: Campus, 1999, 29–38.
- Externe Grenzbildung und interne Strukturierung – Europa und seine Nationen. Eine Rokkansche Forschungsperspektive. Berliner Journal für Soziologie 2 (2000): 151–165.
- Editorial Introduction: The Unity and Diversity of Europe. For the first 4 vols. (2000–2005) of the series The Societies of Europe: A Series of Historical Data Handbooks, pp. V–XIX.

=== Publications and translations into Italian, Spanish and Japanese ===
==== Italian ====
- Il macro modello sviluppo politico europeo di Stein Rokkan. Rivista Italiana di Scienza Politica X, 3 (1980). Bologna: Soc. Ed. Il Mulino (translation of "Stein Rokkans Makro-Modell der politischen Entwicklung Europas: Ein Rekonstruktionsversuch". Kölner Zeitschrift für Soziologie und Sozialpsychologie 33,3 (1981): 397–436).
- Solutione o fonte di crisi? Il welfare state perspettiva storica. In: Maurizio Ferrera (ed.): Lo stato del benessere: Una crisi senza uscita? Firenze: Le Monnier, 1981, 1–58. (translation of "Krisenbewältigung oder Krisenerzeugung? Der Wohlfahrtsstaat in historischer Perspektive". In: Joachim Matthes (ed.): Sozialer Wandel in Westeuropa: Verhandlungen des 19. Deutschen Soziologentages 17.–20. April 1979 im Internationalen Congress Centrum (ICC) in Berlin. Frankfurt a.M., New York: Campus, 1979, 82–136).
- Lo sviluppo del Welfare State in Europa e in America. Bologna: Il Mulino, 1983. [trad. di Sara Emanuelli, Umberto Brindani, Salvatore Lombardo e Sergio Mercuri]. Bologna: Il Mulino, c1983 (stampa 1986) (translation of The Development of Welfare States in Europe and America. New Brunswick, US und London, UK: Transaction Books, 1981, with Arnold Heidenheimer).
- Stato del benessere. In: Bedeschi, Giuseppe (director): Enciclopedia delle Scienze Sociali. Volume 1: Abitazione – Civiltà. Roma: Istituto della Enciclopedia Italiana, 1991, 500–513.
- Stein Rokkan: Stato, nazione e democrazia in Europa. Bologna: Il Mulino 2002 (translation of State Formation, Nation-Building, and Mass Politics in Europe: The Theory of Stein Rokkan. Based on his collected works from the English by Daniele Caramani).

==== Spanish ====
- Los Estados Nacionales del Bienestar y la Integración Europea. In: Luis Moreno Fernández (ed.): Política Social y Estado del Bienestar. Madrid: Ministerio de Asuntos Sociales, Centro de Publicaciones, [1995].

==== Japanese ====
- State, Economy, and Society in Western Europe 1815–1975. A Data Handbook in two Volumes. Frankfurt a.M.: Campus; London: Macmillan Press; Chicago: St. James Press.
  - Vol. I: The Growth of Mass Democracies and Welfare States. 1983 (with Jens Alber, Richard Eichenberg, Jürgen Kohl, Franz Kraus, Winfried Pfenning, and Kurt Seebohm).
  - Vol. II: The Growth of Industrial Societies and Capitalist Economies. 1987 (with Franz Kraus and Winfried Pfenning).

=== Manifold papers, proposals, reports, working papers ===
- Historical Indicators of the Western European Democracies (HIWED). Reports. No. 1–10, 1975–1979. Mannheim: Fakultät für Sozialwissenschaften.
  - Report No. 1: Peter Flora, The HIWED-Project: The Handbook, Theoretical Orientations and Statistical Sources. 1975. Mannheim. 121 pp.
  - Report No. 2: Peter Flora, Quantitative Historical Sociology. Manuscript for 1975 issue of Current Sociology. s.a., 1975?. Mannheim. 113, 61 pp.
  - Report No. 3: Peter Flora, First Drafts of the Data-Handbook and Bibliography. 1975. Mannheim. 50 pp.
  - Report No. 4: Jens Alber, Social Security I: Participants of Social Insurance Systems in Western Europe. 1976. Mannheim. 103 pp.
  - Report No. 5: Peter Flora, in collaboration with Jens Alber and Jürgen Kohl, On the Development of the Western European Welfare States. Paper prepared for delivery at Edinburgh IPSA Congress of August 16–21, 1976. 1976. Mannheim. 59 pp.
  - Report No. 6: Jürgen Kohl, Elections I: Enfranchisement and Electoral Participation. 1977. Universität Bielefeld and Universität zu Köln: Forschungsinstitut für Soziologie. 86 pp.
  - Report No. 7: Peter Flora, Krisenbewältigung oder Krisenerzeugung? Der Wohlfahrtsstaat in historischer Perspektive. Beitrag zum 19. Deutschen Soziologentag in Berlin vom 17. bis 20. April 1979. 1979. Universität zu Köln: Forschungsinstitut für Soziologie. 46, 10 pp.
  - Report No. 8: Kurt Seebohm, The Development of Tax Structure in Western Europe 1850–1975. 1977. Universität zu Köln: Forschungsinstitut für Soziologie. 168 pp.
  - Report No. 9: Peter Flora, Solution or Source of Crises? The Welfare State in Historical Perspective. (s.a.). Universität zu Köln: Forschungsinstitut für Soziologie. 53, 10 pp.
  - Report No. 10: Richard C. Eichenberg, Bureaucracy and Public Employment: Historical Data for the West European Democracies. 1979. Universität zu Köln: Forschungsinstitut für Soziologie. 91 pp.
- West Europa Daten Archiv. Western European Data Archive (WEDA). Reports. No. (s.a.). Universität zu Köln: Zentralarchiv für Empirische Sozialforschung.
  - Report No. (without no.): Population Censuses: Population by Age, Sex and Marital Status (Raw Data) (with Winfried Pfenning). 1980. 219 pp.
- Bibliographie der Volks- und Berufszählungen in Europa seit 1800. s.a., ca. 1975 (with Regina Kays). 96 pp.
- Modernisierung und die Entwicklung der europäischen Wohlfahrtsstaaten. Habilitation thesis. Mannheim: Fakultät für Sozialwissenschaften, 1976.
- The European Welfare States and European Integration: Some Lessons from the Theory of European State and Nation-building. Paper for the World Congress of Sociology in Madrid, 9–13 July 1990, Session 6 RC 19 Social Policy and the European Community in the 1990s, organized by Anne-Marie Guillemard, University Paris. 18 pp.
- Abschlußbericht zur Aufbauphase des Mannheimer Zentrums für Europäische Sozialforschung: 1989–1992. Mannheim: Mannheimer Zentrums für Europäische Sozialforschung, 1993.
- Family Change and Family Policies in the West: A Series of Country Studies and Comparative Analyses Examining Major Changes in the Family and the Broad Spectrum of Family Policies in Western Industrial Society in the Second Half of the Twentieth Century. Oxford: Clarendon Press (with Sheila B. Kamerman and Alfred J. Kahn).
  - Peter Cuyvers, Anton Kuijsten †, and Hans-Joachim Schulze, Family Change and Family Policies: The Netherlands. To be published in Volume II of the series: Family Change and Family Policies in Consociational Democracies Belgium, Switzerland, and The Netherlands. Oxford: Clarendon Press, 2002. Preprints of the Mannheim Centre for European Social Research No. 1.
  - Thomas Bahle, Birgit Fix, Peter Flora, Franz Kraus, Franz Rothenbacher, Harry Willekens, Family Change and Family Policies: Belgium. To be published in Volume II of the series: Family Change and Family Policies in Consociational Democracies Belgium, Switzerland, and The Netherlands. Oxford: Clarendon Press, 2002. Preprints of the Mannheim Centre for European Social Research No. 2.
  - Torben Fridberg, Family Change and Family Policies: Denmark. To be published in Volume III of the series: Family Change and Family Policies in the Nordic Countries: Denmark, Finland, Iceland, Norway, Sweden. Oxford: Clarendon Press, 2002. Preprints of the Mannheim Centre for European Social Research No. 3.
  - Jon Eivind Kolberg, Family Change and Family Policies: Norway. To be published in Volume III of the series: Family Change and Family Policies in the Nordic Countries: Denmark, Finland, Iceland, Norway, Sweden. Oxford: Clarendon Press, 2002. Preprints of the Mannheim Centre for European Social Research No. 4.
  - Eva M. Bernhardt, Ulla Björnberg, Ann-Zofie Divander, Gudny Björk Eydal, Björn Halleröd, Jonas Hinnfors, Anna-Karin Kollind, Family Change and Family Policies: Sweden. To be published in Volume III of the series: Family Change and Family Policies in the Nordic Countries: Denmark, Finland, Iceland, Norway, Sweden. Oxford: Clarendon Press, 2002. Preprints of the Mannheim Centre for European Social Research No. 5.
  - Matti Alestalo, Virpi Kosunen, Ann Muuri, Irma-Leena Notkola, Riitta Säntti, Pentti Takala, Family Change and Family Policies: Finland. To be published in Volume III of the series: Family Change and Family Policies in the Nordic Countries: Denmark, Finland, Iceland, Norway, Sweden. Oxford: Clarendon Press, 2002. Preprints of the Mannheim Centre for European Social Research No. 6.
  - Beat Fux, Family Change and Family Policies: Switzerland. To be published in Volume II of the series: Family Change and Family Policies in Consociational Democracies Belgium, Switzerland, and The Netherlands. Oxford: Clarendon Press, 2002. Preprints of the Mannheim Centre for European Social Research No. 8.
  - Thomas Bahle, Birgit Fix, Franz Rothenbacher, Family Change and Family Policies: Germany. To be published in Volume V of the series: Family Change and Family Policies in Consociational Democracies Belgium, Switzerland, and The Netherlands. Oxford: Clarendon Press, 2002. Preprints of the Mannheim Centre for European Social Research No. 10.
