= Heinz-Herbert Noll =

German sociologist

- Born: 1 January 1949 (age 77)
- Occupation: Sociologist

Heinz-Herbert Noll (born 1 January 1949) is a German sociologist.

== Education ==
Noll studied sociology, economics, social policy and statistics at the Goethe University Frankfurt. After the diploma in sociology he wrote a dissertation at the chair of Wolfgang Zapf at the University of Mannheim and received his philosophers degree (Dr. phil.) in 1981 with a thesis on "Occupational Chances and Working Conditions: A Social Report for the Federal Republic of Germany 1950–1980“ („Beschäftigungschancen und Arbeitsbedingungen: Ein Sozialbericht für die Bundesrepublik 1950–1980“) (1982).

== Profession ==
=== Research ===
From 1981 to 1987 Noll was scientific member of the SPES-project and the Special Research Group 3 „Microanalytic Foundations of Societal Policies“ (Sonderforschungsbereich 3 „Mikroanalytische Grundlagen der Gesellschaftspolitik“) (Sfb3); afterwards he became project director and director of a research area of the Sfb 3. During this time he specialized in the field of labour market sociology and wrote a dissertation within this realm.

In 1987 he became head of the newly created „Department for Social Indicators“ („Abteilung Soziale Indikatoren“) of ZUMA (today GESIS – Leibniz Institute for the Social Sciences). The main task of this research group consists in the permanent institutionalization of welfare research and of social reporting for Germany as a scientific basic service. Over several years, diverse activities developed from this general purpose. These consist in:

- to continue and update the SPES „Social Indicator Table“ for Germany
- to organize seminaries and workshops in social indicators research
- to contribute to the „Data Report“ („Datenreport“)
- to edit a Newsletter or „Information Service Social Indicators“ („Informationsdienst soziale Indikatoren“)
- scientific counselling and writing of expert opinions
- international co-operation, as e.g. in the International Society for Quality of Life Studies (ISQLS)
- to organize research projects, as, for example of a project to develop a system of European social indicators

=== Teaching ===
Noll taught at the Universities of Mannheim and Heidelberg, the University of Tartu, the Université Fribourg, the Università degli Studi di Firenze and the École Nationale de la Statistique et de l'Administration Économique in Paris. In addition he was offered guest professorships from several foreign research institutes and universities.

=== Honorary offices ===
Noll was called into several scientific and policy advisory bodies, for example as a speaker of the "Section of Social Indicators" ("Sektion Soziale Indikatoren") of the German Sociological Association (Deutsche Gesellschaft für Soziologie, DGS) or president of the ISA-Research Committee 55 "Social Indicators". Finally until 2012 he was president of the International Society for Quality of Life Studies (ISQLS).

Noll furthermore held positions as a councillor in various research projects and was member of the Editorial boards of journals like Social Indicators Research, Current Sociology and Applied Research in Quality of Life

== Scientific importance ==
Nollʼs sociological significance consists in institutionalizing the earlier work done by his teacher Wolfgang Zapf and his colleagues in SPES and Sfb 3: by doing this, Noll, in international comparison, saved Germany a prominent ranking place in the scale of social reporting intensity. This way, Germany became one of the leading actors in this field of applied sociology. In addition, Noll contributed to disseminate knowledge of social indicators on the European level, by this way encouraging attempts by Eurostat and the European Commission to make social reporeting a permanent task at the level of European Union authorities.

== Publications ==
=== Books (author, co-author, editor) ===
- (1982), Beschäftigungschancen und Arbeitsbedingungen: Ein Sozialbericht für die Bundesrepublik 1950–1980. Frankfurt and New York: Campus. (Mannheim University, dissertation, 1981). (Schriftenreihe Sonderforschungsbereich 3 Mikroanalytische Grundlagen der Gesellschaftspolitik, vol. 9).
- (together with Wolfgang Glatzer, co-author), ed. (1992), Lebensverhältnisse in Deutschland: Ungleichheit und Angleichung. Frankfurt and New York: Campus. (Soziale Indikatoren, vol. 16).
- ed. (1993), System sozialer Indikatoren für die Bundesrepublik Deutschland: Zeitreihen 1950–1991; Tabellenband. Mannheim: Zentrum für Umfragen, Methoden und Analysen, Department Soziale Indikatoren. (Eine ZUMA-Publikation).
- (together with Roland Habich) (1994), Soziale Indikatoren und Sozialberichterstattung: internationale Erfahrungen und gegenwärtiger Forschungsstand; Expertise. Berne: Bundesamt für Statistik. (Bundesamt für Statistik, Statistik der Schweiz, 16: Kultur, Lebensbedingungen, Sport).
- (co-author and ed.) (1997), Sozialberichterstattung in Deutschland: Konzepte, Methoden und Ergebnisse für Lebensbereiche und Bevölkerungsgruppen. Weinheim et al.: Juventa-Verlag. (Grundlagentexte Soziologie).
- (together with Roland Habich, co-author), ed. (2000), Vom Zusammenwachsen einer Gesellschaft: Analysen zur Angleichung der Lebensverhältnisse in Deutschland. Frankfurt and New York: Campus. (Soziale Indikatoren, vol. 21).
- (together with Yannick Lemel, co-author), ed. (2002), Changing Structures of Social Inequality: A Comparative Perspective. Montreal et al.: McGill-Queenʼs University Press. (Comparative Charting of Social Change).

=== Journal articles, chapters in edited volumes ===
- (1990), Lebensqualität in der Bundesrepublik Deutschland: Methoden der Messung und ausgewählte Ergebnisse. In: Evangelische Akademie Baden; Ulrich Duchrow, eds, Protokoll einer Konsultation der Evangelischen Akademie Baden am 29./30. September 1989 im August-Winnig-Haus, Wilhelmsfeld. Karlsruhe, 26–33.
- (1997), Sozialberichterstattung: Zielsetzungen, Funktionen und Formen. In: ibidem, ed., Sozialberichterstattung in Deutschland: Konzepte, Methoden und Ergebnisse für Lebensbereiche und Bevölkerungsgruppen. Weinheim et al.: Juventa-Verlag, 7–16. (Grundlagentexte Soziologie).
- (1999), Die Perspektive der Sozialberichterstattung. In: Peter Flora, ed., Sozialberichterstattung und Sozialstaatsbeobachtung: individuelle Wohlfahrt und wohlfahrtsstaatliche Institutionen im Spiegel empirischer Analysen. Frankfurt and New York: Campus, 13–28. (Soziale Indikatoren, vol. 20).
- (2002), Globale Wohlfahrtsmaße als Instrumente der Wohlfahrtsmessung und Sozialberichterstattung: Funktionen, Ansätze und Probleme. In: Wolfgang Glatzer, ed., Sozialer Wandel und gesellschaftliche Dauerbeobachtung. [Festschrift für Wolfgang Zapf]. Opladen: Leske and Budrich, 317–35.
- (2003), Sozialindikatorenforschung und Sozialberichterstattung: Ziele, Ergebnisse und aktuelle Entwicklungen. In: Barbara Orth, Thomas Schwietring et al., eds., Soziologische Forschung: Stand und Perspektiven: Ein Handbuch. Opladen: Leske and Budrich, 449–66.

=== Working papers, expert opinions, hectographs ===
- Noll wrote numerous contributions to the Informationsdienst soziale Indikatoren (Information Service Social Indicators) (Mannheim: GESIS) which are not listed here individually. Please confer the entries under Journal editor and External links.
- (ca. 1977), Soziale Indikatoren der Beschäftigung: Daten für eine zielorientierte Politik. Frankfurt am Main. (SPES, no. 74).
- (1979), Kriterien und Mechanismen der beruflichen Plazierung: ein Aspekt der Wohlfahrtsproduktion. Frankfurt am Main: Johann Wolfgang-Goethe-Universität. (Sonderforschungsbereich 3, Working Paper, no. 7).
- (1982), Determinanten der Wiederbeschäftigung von Arbeitslosen: eine multivariate Analyse von Survey-Daten. Frankfurt am Main: Johann Wolfgang-Goethe-Universität. (Sonderforschungsbereich 3, Working Paper, no. 81).
- (1983), Probleme des Berufseintritts von Jugendlichen im Kontext der Entwicklungen auf dem Lehrstellenmarkt: Vortrag, gehalten in der Reihe Akademischer Winter 1982/83 der Stadt, Universität und der Abendakademie Mannheim: Perspektiven und Probleme der Beschäftigungspolitik in den 80er Jahren. Frankfurt am Main: Johann Wolfgang-Goethe-Universität. (Sonderforschungsbereich 3, Working Paper, no. 100).
- (1985), Weiterbildung und Berufsverlauf: Empirische Analyse zum Weiterbildungsverhalten von Erwerbstätigen in der Bundesrepublik. Frankfurt am Main: Johann Wolfgang-Goethe-Universität. (Sonderforschungsbereich 3, Working Paper, no. 177).
- (together with Walter Müller) (2003), Arbeit und Sozialstruktur. Mannheim: Mannheimer Zentrum für Europäische Sozialforschung. (MZES Working Papers, Arbeitsbereich I, no. 13).
- (1999), New Structures of Inequality: Some Trends of Social Change in Modernized Societies. Berlin: WZB. (Veröffentlichungen der Abteilung Sozialstruktur und Sozialberichterstattung des Forschungsschwerpunktes Sozialer Wandel, Institutionen und Vermittlungsprozesse des Wissenschaftszentrums Berlin für Sozialforschung, no. 99/405).
- (1999), Konzepte der Wohlfahrtsentwicklung: Lebensqualität und „neue“ Wohlfahrtskonzepte. Mannheim: Zuma. (EuReporting Working Paper, no. 3). With the same title published as: Working Paper of the WZB, Berlin 2000 (Veröffentlichungsreihe der Querschnittsgruppe Arbeit und Ökologie des Wissenschaftszentrums Berlin für Sozialforschung, no. 00/505).
- (together with Regina Berger-Schmitt) (2000), Conceptual Framework and Structure of a European System of Social Indicators. Mannheim: Zuma. (EuReporting Working Paper, no. 9).

=== Journal editor ===
- Informationsdienst soziale Indikatoren (Information Service Social Indicators). Mannheim: GESIS, ISSN 0935-218X.
