= Veselin Đuretić =

Yugoslav and Serbian historian (1933–2020)

- Born: 17 May 1933; Mojanovići, Kingdom of Yugoslavia
- Died: 18 February 2020 (aged 86); Belgrade, Serbia
- Occupation: historian
- Notable work: Saveznici i ratna drama

Veselin Đuretić (Serbian Cyrillic: Веселин Ђуретић; 17 May 1933 – 18 February 2020) was a Yugoslav and Serbian historian.

== Early life ==
Đuretić was born on 17 May 1933 in the village of Mojanovići near Podgorica, Zeta Banovina, Kingdom of Yugoslavia (modern-day Montenegro). He was associate of Balkan Institute of the Serbian Academy of Science and Arts and one of founders of the Academy of Sciences and Arts of the Republika Srpska (SANU). During 1990's Đuretić was close to Serbian Radical Party and member of the International Committee for the Truth About Radovan Karadžić. In 2012 he was a candidate for member of the Serbian academy.

== Allies and War Drama ==
The book authored by Đuretić in 1985 titled "Saveznici i ratna drama"(English: Allies and War Drama) was first book which rehabilitate Chetniks published in post-war Socialistic Yugoslavia. The effect of this book was compared to the earthquake while rehabilitation of Chetniks it contained was received with big attention among Serbs. Because this work opened taboo topic from the World War II, it was perceived by Yugoslav Peoples Army as an attack to the basic foundations of the communist revolution and its Admiral Branko Mamula publicly condemned Đuretić and its publisher Serbian Academy of Science and Arts In this book Đuretić consistently emphasized that Chetniks of Draža Mihailović were antifascists, persistently rejecting any existence of Greater-Serbian hegemony or ethnicity based exploitation insuring the Kingdom of Yugoslavia.

== Reactions ==
Egbert Jahn emphasized that before Đuretić published this work the Yugoslav communist influenced historiography promoted a misrepresented image of Chetniks depicted only as "collaborators and traitors". Jahn further underlined that Đuretić's work was a long overdue change of this misrepresented image of Chetniks and also a complete reinterpretation of the recent history of Serbs.

According to some sources, Đuretić invested his substantial capabilities to try to fulfill Greater Serbian political ideology. The Serbian Supreme Court confirmed the first level court decision to ban the distribution of all three editions of Đuretić's work.

== Death ==
Đuretić died on 18 February 2020 in Belgrade. He is interred at the New Bežanija Cemetery.

== Bibliography ==
- Narodna vlast u BiH 1941-1945: razvitak i djelatnost NOO. Narodna knjiga--ISI. 1981.
- Vlada na bespuću: internacionalizacija jugoslovenskih protivrječnosti na političkoj pozornici drugog svjetskog rata. Institut za savremenu istoriju. 1982.
- Saveznici i Jugoslovenska ratna drama: Izmedu nacionalnih i ideolos︣kih izazova. Srpska akademija nauka i umetnosti, Balkanolos︣ki institut. 1985.
- Saveznici i jugoslovenska ratna drama. Vol. 2. Narodna knjiga. 1985.
- Одговор jавном тужиоцу. Наша реч. 1987.
- Razaranje srpstva u XX veku: ideološka upotreba istorije. Balkanološki institut SANU. 1992. ISBN 9788671790147.
- Demolition of Serbs in the 20th Century: Background of the Current Drama in Dismembered Yugoslavia. Great Lakes Graphics. 1993.
- Nasilje nad srpskim ustankom: opsene naroda u ime "Rusije i komunizma". Srpska akademija nauka i umetnosti. 1997. ISBN 9788671790246.
- Upotreba Rusije i Zapada: obmane saveznika zarad Velikohrvatske politike. Srpska akademija nauka i umetnosti, Balkanološki institut. 1997. ISBN 9788671790246.

== Sources ==
- Goluža, Božo (2005). Hrvatski put slobode: komentari hrvatske društvene zbilje : 1998-2005. Crkva na kamenu.
- Marijan, Davor (2008). Slom titove armije: Jugoslavenska narodna armija i raspad Jugoslavije 1987.-1992. Golden marketing-Tehnička knjiga. ISBN 978-953-212-339-5.
- Jahn, Egbert (January 2009). Nationalism in Late and Post-Communist Europe. Nomos. ISBN 978-3-8329-3969-4.
