= Wolfgang Zapf =

German sociologist (1937–2018)

- Born: April 25, 1937; Frankfurt
- Died: April 26, 2018 (aged 81); Berlin
- Occupation: Sociologist

Wolfgang Zapf (* Frankfurt am Main 25 April 1937; † Berlin 26 April 2018) was a German sociologist.

== Education ==
Zapf visited basic school and secondary school emphasizing modern languages in Frankfurt am Main. He obtained his final examination in 1957.

From 1957 to 1961 he studied sociology and economics at the universities of Frankfurt, Hamburg and Cologne. He received a scholarship from the "Cusanuswerk" and during his studies he obtained practical training in market research and industry. In 1961, he finished his studies in Frankfurt with a diploma in sociology.

== Profession ==
From 1962 to 1966, he worked as an assistant of Ralf Dahrendorf at the sociological department of the University of Tübingen. In 1963 he received his doctoral degree in Tübingen with a dissertation on the historical changes of the German elite ("Wandlungen der deutschen Elite") (Munich: Piper, 1965, 21966). During these years the sociological investigation of elites was a highly topical field of research and was intensively cultivated by Dahrendorf. From 1966 to 1967 Zapf was scientific assistant of Dahrendorf at the University of Constance. In 1967 he delivered his habilitation thesis "Materials for the Analysis of Social Change" ("Materialien zur Analyse des sozialen Wandels"), which was distributed as a hectograph.

In 1968 he was German Kennedy Fellow at the Harvard University. From 1968 to 1972 Zapf was regular professor for sociology at the Goethe University Frankfurt. In 1972 he accepted a chair at the University of Mannheim, where be taught sociology until 1987.

During the early 1970s in co-operation with economists from the Goethe University Frankfurt he organized the SPES project (Sozialpolitisches Entscheidungs- und Indikatorensystem, Sociopolitical Decision Making and Indicator System). This project in 1979 was continued by the Special Research Group 3 Microanalytic Foundations of Societal Policies, Frankfurt/Mannheim (Sonderforschungsbereichs 3 "Mikroanalytische Grundlagen der Gesellschaftspolitik").

In September 1987 Zapf was appointed scientific manager (president) of the Wissenschaftszentrums Berlin für Sozialforschung (WZB); he held this office until 31 August 1994. At the same time he directed the "Department for Social Structure and Social Reporting" ("Abteilung Sozialstruktur und Sozialberichterstattung"); this latter function he kept until his retirement in 2002. In addition to his tasks at the WZB from 1988 to 2002 Zapf continued teaching as professor for sociology at the Free University of Berlin.

Zapf also taught at several other European and American universities: in 1980 he was Visiting Professor for Comparative European Studies at Stanford University. In 1976, 1981 and 1986 he taught as a guest professor at the Institute for Advanced Studies (Vienna) (IHS). In 1980 he was a visiting fellow at the Hoover Institution of Stanford University.

== Honorary positions ==
=== Universities Frankfurt and Mannheim ===
From 1969 until 1970 Zapf was member of the senate of the University of Frankfurt. From 1974 to 1975 and 1982 to 1983 he held the office of the dean of the Faculty for Social Sciences of the University of Mannheim. From 1973 to 1975 he directed the Institute for Social Sciences of the University of Mannheim.

=== Special Research Group 3 ===
In 1979, 1981 and from 1985 to 1987 he hold the office of a speaker of the Special Research Group 3 Microanalytic Foundations of Societal Policies, Frankfurt/Mannheim; in 1980 and from 1982 to 1984 as vice-speaker.

=== German Sociological Association / Deutsche Gesellschaft für Soziologie (DGS) ===
From 1967 to 1974, and 1983 to 1984 he was member of the managing board of the DGS, and from 1987 to 1990 he was president of the German Sociological Association. From 1973 to 1976 he was president of the DGS-section "Social Indicators" (Sektion Soziale Indikatoren).

=== Deutsche Forschungsgemeinschaft (DFG) ===
From 1973 until 1975 Zapf headed the planning group for social sciences at the Deutsche Forschungsgemeinschaft (German Research Foundation). From 1976 to 1985 he was a member of the Senate Commission for Empirical Social Research (Senatskommission für Empirische Sozialforschung der DFG).

=== Center for Social Indicators in the SSRC ===
From 1972 to 1977 Zapf was a member of the Steering Committee of the Center for Social Indicators of the Social Science Research Council (SSRC) in Washington, D.C.

=== International Society for Quality of Life Studies (ISQLS) ===
Zapf was a member of the ISQLS.

=== GESIS – Leibniz-Institut für Sozialwissenschaften ===
From 1993 to 1999 Zapf was president of the board of trustees of GESIS.

== Editor and journal adviser ==
From 1987 to 1909 Zapf was co-editor of the "Zeitschrift für Soziologie", and an advisory member of Social Indicators Research and grant evaluator of the Alexander von Humboldt Foundation.

== Scientific importance ==
Zapf’s main working fields are– in a chronological view of their appearance– in the domains of the sociology of elites, societal modernization and – neatly related – social change, social reporting and social indicators research.

Zapf‘s early publications deal with elite research, mainly with the long-term evolution of the German elite. Probably related to that developed his interest in long-term trends of social change at the macro level which he thematized in his habilitation thesis. Obviously he came in touch with modernization research which was just en vogue in the USA in the 1960s. This was the origin of his first works on modernization theory and the edited volume "Theories of Social Change" (Theorien des sozialen Wandels). On the one hand it was envisioned to empirically verify such theories by a historical-comparative data collection on the development of west European societies; for this purpose, together with Peter Flora, Zapf applied for the HIWED-project (Historical Indicators of West European Democracies). On the other hand stood the implementation of social indicators research in Germany; the origin of the latter research also lies in the USA of the 1960s. The SPES-project was believed to develop a system of social macro indicators. Main products of this work were the "Sociological Almanac" ("Soziologische Almanach") and the edited volume "Living Conditions in the Federal Republic of Germany" ("Lebensbedingungen in der Bundesrepublik") (1977, 21978); the latter book used the instrument of social indicators in order to apply it to the Federal Republic of Germany. The nucleus of the volume is a so-called "Social Indicator Table" ("Sozialindikatorentableau") with several hundred indicators which were quantified in the work that followed. A historically much more extended perspective was to look at the evolution of German living conditions from the 19th century to the present: this was done in the book "Changing Living Conditions in Germany: Welfare Development since Industrialization" ("Wandel der Lebensbedingungen in Deutschland: Wohlfahrtsentwicklung seit der Industrialisierung") (1982).

New lands within sociology with respect to analysis of large data sets were beaten by Zapf‘s assistants Johann Handl, Karl Ulrich Mayer and Walter Müller in the SPES-project to exploit the supplementary survey to the microcensus 1971 which resulted in the publication "Class Positions and Social Structure" ("Klassenlagen und Sozialstruktur"), being the first class analysis for Germany with micro data.

It could soon be seen that macro indicators alone are unable to cover many social topics, because the main source of these indicators was official statistics which does not carry out opinion and attitude surveys. In analogy to the American situation it was attempted to develop a social survey covering subjective and objective topics at the same time, and thus can be mutually related: this instrument was the "Welfare Survey" ("Wohlfahrtssurvey"). The central publication – based on exploitations of this survey – was "Quality of Life in the Federal Republic of Germany: Objective Living Conditions and Subjective Well-being" ("Lebensqualität in der Bundesrepublik: Objektive Lebensbedingungen und subjektives Wohlbefinden") (1984). Many other publications using this data source followed, up to the current "Data Report" ("Datenreport"). The central theoretical concept of this work was quality of life-research according to the US-American model. The development of panel studies during the 1980s, like the German Socio-Economic Panel, offered the possibility to integrate questions asked in the welfare surveys into this panel study, thus being able to show the evolution of quality of life over the life course.

Having created these data sources meant now to dispose of a solid basis for diverse "data compilations" and analyses of social structure and welfare. Zapfs movement to the WZB Berlin in 1987 and the collapse of the German Democratic Republic (GDR) opened new research fields. First, by extending the welfare survey to Eastern Germany, a data basis for social scientific transformation research could be created. In the course of the last two decades the separate analysis and opposing of East and West became increasingly irrelevant, although.

Zapf‘s theoretical background remained modernization theory and he is counted for as the most prominent representative of modernization research in German sociology. The nucleus of modernization finds Zapf "in the increase of the adaptive and steering capacities of a whole society, i.e. as a positive balance of rising resources and rising burdens" In the course of time concepts of social steering, possibilities of social planning and the openness for social innovations of societies became of central importance to him.

The collapse of the Socialist economic system offered possibilities to him to expand his theoretical notions, e.g. by the concept of "modernization made good" ("nachgeholte Modernisierung").

Representatives of more recent concepts of modernization in modernization research take a more critical position against modernization theory in a narrow sense – which was denoted by Zapf as "an American invention of the 1950s". This new interpretation of modernization theory is less ethnocentric and path dependent, and is also sensitive towards failures and shydy sides (e.g. environmental hazard, competition in armaments, external economic effects of Western industrialized countries). If we want to admit Rucht to speak, then societal modernization "is a variant-rich and in no way a linear evolution, characterized by uncoincident processes, step backs and contradicting changes in parts of the social system". The "model of a modern society", building the fundament, might be attained by walking on a limited number of "different developmental paths".

Zapf was successful in promoting and placing young sociologists: thus, among his former students and research assistants are Karl Ulrich Mayer, Walter Müller, Peter Flora, Johann Handl, Jens Alber, Wolfgang Glatzer, Heinz-Herbert Noll, Jürgen Kohl, Roland Habich, Franz Rothenbacher and many others.

== Family ==
In 1966 Zapf married Dr. Katrin Zapf, born Raschig. Two children were born to them. His wife Katrin Zapf is also a sociologist, and specialized herself in – and taught at the University of Mannheim – urban sociology.

== Publications ==
=== Books (author, co-author, editor) ===
- (together with Joachim Bergmann) (1965), Kommunikation im Industriebetrieb. Frankfurt a.M.: Europäische Verlagsanstalt.
- (1965, 2nd ed. 1966), Wandlungen der deutschen Elite. Munich: Piper. (dissertation).
- (ed. and co-author) (1965), Beiträge zur Analyse der deutschen Oberschicht. Munich: Piper.
- (ed.) (1969, 4th ed. 1979), Theorien des sozialen Wandels. Königstein/Ts.: Verlagsgruppe Athenäum, Hain, Scriptor, Hanstein. (Neue wissenschaftliche Bibliothek, vol. 31: Soziologie).
- (ed.) (1974, 1975), Soziale Indikatoren: Konzepte und Forschungsansätze. vol. 1 and 2, Frankfurt a.M.: Herder & Herder, 1974. vol. 3, Frankfurt a.M.: Campus, 1975.
- (ed.) (1976), Gesellschaftspolitische Zielsysteme. Soziale Indikatoren, vol. 4. Frankfurt a.M.: Campus.
- (1976), Sozialberichterstattung: Möglichkeiten und Probleme. Göttingen: Verlag Otto Schwartz & Co. (Kommission für wirtschaftlichen und sozialen Wandel, vol. 125).
- (together with Hans Jürgen Krupp) (1977), Sozialpolitik und Sozialberichterstattung. Frankfurt a.M. and New York: Campus.
- (ed. and co-author) (1977), Probleme der Modernisierungspolitik. Meisenheim am Glan: Verlag Anton Hain. (Mannheimer sozialwissenschaftliche Studien, vol. 14).
- (ed. and co-author) (1977, 2nd ed. 1978), Lebensbedingungen in der Bundesrepublik. Frankfurt a.M. and New York: Campus.
- (ed. together with Erich Wiegand) (1982), Wandel der Lebensbedingungen in Deutschland: Wohlfahrtsentwicklung seit der Industrialisierung. Frankfurt a.M.: Campus.
- (together with Wolfgang Glatzer and others) (1984), Lebensqualität in der Bundesrepublik: Objektive Lebensbedingungen und subjektives Wohlbefinden. Frankfurt a.M. and New York: Campus.
- (ed. and co-author) (1987), German Social Report. In: Social Indicators Research, vol. 19, no. 1: 5–171.
- (together with others) (1987), Individualisierung und Sicherheit: Untersuchungen zur Lebensqualität in der Bundesrepublik Deutschland. Munich: Beck. (Perspektiven und Orientierungen, vol. 4).
- (1987), Aufsätze zur Modernisierungsforschung und Modernisierungstheorie. Mannheim: hectograph, 1987.
- (1994), Modernisierung, Wohlfahrtsentwicklung und Transformation: Soziologische Aufsätze 1987–1994. Berlin: Sigma.
- (ed. together with Meinolf Dierkes, co-author) (1994), Institutionenvergleich und Institutionendynamik. WZB-Jahrbuch 1994. Berlin: Sigma.
- (ed. together with Hansgert Peisert) (1994), Gesellschaft, Demokratie und Lebenschancen: Festschrift für Ralf Dahrendorf. Stuttgart: Deutsche Verlagsanstalt.
- (ed.) (1996), Lebenslagen im Wandel: Sozialberichterstattung im Längsschnitt. Frankfurt a.M. and New York: Campus-Verlag, 1996.
- (ed. and co-author together with Roland Habich) (1996, 21997), Wohlfahrtsentwicklung im vereinten Deutschland: Sozialstruktur, sozialer Wandel und Lebensqualität. Berlin: Sigma.
- (ed. with Bernhard Schäfers) (1998, 2nd ed. 2001), Handwörterbuch zur Gesellschaft Deutschlands. Opladen: Leske und Budrich.
- (Wolfgang Glatzer, ed.) (2002), Sozialer Wandel und gesellschaftliche Dauerbeobachtung. [Festschrift für Wolfgang Zapf]. Opladen: Leske und Budrich.

=== Journal articles, chapters in edited volumes ===
- (1963), Ein Modell zur Beschreibung der sozialen Zirkulation deutscher Führungsgruppen. In: Studien und Berichte aus dem Soziologischen Seminar der Universität Tübingen, no. 1: 35–48.
- (1963), Drei Skizzen zur Literatursoziologie. In: Studien und Berichte, no. 2: 49–62.
- (1964), Die Leser der Massenpresse. In: Studien und Berichte, no. 3: 20–36.
- (1965), Die Sozialstruktur deutscher Parlamente. In: F. Sänger and K. Liepelt, eds, Wahlhandbuch 1965. Frankfurt a.M.: Europäische Verlagsanstalt, Sektion 3.25, 2–29.
- (1965), The Sociology in Western Germany. The American-German Review 31: 27–35.
- (1966), Angst vor der wissenschaftlichen Frage: Zur Diskussion über das katholische Bildungsdefizit. In: N. Greinacher and Th. Risse, eds, Bilanz des deutschen Katholizismus. Mainz: Grünewald, 405–40.
- (1966), Soziologieunterricht an deutschen Schulen? In: F. Minssen, ed., Politische Bildung als Aufgabe. Frankfurt a.M.: Diesterweg, 214–24.
- (1966), Max Webers Theorie der Ordnung und des Fortschritts. In: Studien und Berichte, no. 7: 16–22.
- (1968), Complex Societies and Social Change: Problems of Macro-Sociology. Social Science Information 7: 7–30. Reprinted in: UNESCO, The Social Sciences: Problems and Orientations. The Hague and Paris: Mouton, 252–73.
- (1971), Der nachgeholte Aufstieg: Untersuchungen über Absolventen des Zweiten Bildungsweges. Neue Sammlung 11: 249–73.
- (together with Peter Flora) (1971), Zeitreihen als Indikatoren der Modernisierung: Einige Probleme der Datensammlung und Datenanalyse. Politische Vierteljahresschrift 12,1: 29–70 (German translation of „Some Problems of Time-series Analysis in Research on Modernization.“ Social Science Information 10: 53–102). Reprinted in Shmuel Eisenstadt and Stein Rokkan, eds, Building States and Nations. Vol. 1. Beverly Hills: Sage, 161–211.
- (1972), Social Indicators: Prospects for Social Accounting Systems. Social Science Information 11: 243–277. German: Soziale Indikatoren. In: G. Albrecht et al., eds, Soziologie: René König zum 65. Geburtstag. Köln: Westdeutscher Verlag, 1973, 261–90.
- (1972), Work on Social Indicators in the German Federal Republic. Social Science Information 11: 279–85.
- (1972), Zur Messung der Lebensqualität. Zeitschrift für Soziologie 1: 267–79.
- (1972), Lebensqualität und Soziale Indikatoren. Archiv für Wissenschaft und Praxis der sozialen Arbeit 3: 267–79.
- (1973), Gesellschaftliche Dauerbeobachtung und aktive Politik. Allgemeines Statistisches Archiv 57: 143–63. Englisch: The Polity as Monitor of the Quality of Life. American Behavioural Scientist 17: 651–75. Reprinted in: L. Milbrath and F. Inscho, eds, The Politics of Environmental Quality. Beverly Hills: Sage, 35–59, and Karl W. Deutsch, ed. (1977), Ecosocial Systems and Ecopolitics. Paris: UNESCO, 235–52.
- (1974), Soziale Indikatoren – Ein Überblick. In: Wolfgang Zapf, ed., Soziale Indikatoren I. Frankfurt a.M.: Herder & Herder, 3–16.
- (1974), Zur Messung der öffentlichen Armut. In: Wolfgang Zapf, ed., Soziale Indikatoren I. Frankfurt a.M.: Herder & Herder, 187–214.
- (1974), Modernisierungstheorien. In: D. Grimm, ed., Prismata: Dank an Bernhard Hannsler. Pullach: Verlag Dokumentation, 302–17.
- (1974), Social Indicators 1973: Comparisons with Social Reports of Other Nations. In: R. van Dusen, ed., Social Indicators 1973: A Review Symposium. Washington, D.C.: Social Science Research Council, 20–40.
- (1974), Sozialbericherstattung und amtliche Statistik. Beilage zu Wirtschaft und Statistik, no. 8: 3–8.
- (1974), Eliten. In: Eike Ballerstedt and Wolfgang Glatzer, eds, Soziologischer Almanach. Frankfurt a.M.: Herder & Herder, 341–62.
- (1975), Zu einigen Grundproblemen der Sozialberichterstattung. In: Meinolf Dierkes, ed., Soziale Daten und politische Planung. Frankfurt a.M.: Campus, 51–65.
- (1975), Die soziologische Theorie der Modernisierung. Soziale Welt 26: 212–26.
- (1975), Systeme sozialer Indikatoren: Ansätze und Probleme. In: Wolfgang Zapf, ed., Soziale Indikatoren III. Frankfurt a.M.: Campus, 169–92. Englisch: Systems of Social Indicators: Current Approaches and Problems. International Social Science Journal 27: 479–98.
- (1976), Soziale Indikatoren: Eine Zwischenbilanz. Allgemeines Statistisches Archiv 60: 1–16. Reprinted in Hans Jürgen Hoffmann-Nowotny, ed., Soziale Indikatoren. Frauenfeld: Huber, 29–49.
- (1976), International, Public, and Private Actors in Social Reporting. Social Indicators Newsletter, no.. 10, Sept. 1976, Washington, D.C.: Social Science Research Council.
- (together with Hans Jürgen Krupp) (1977), Indikatoren, soziale. Handwörterbuch der Wirtschaftswissenschaften (HdWW), 3./4. Lieferung, 120–33.
- (1977), Lebensqualität in der Bundesrepublik: Methoden der Messung und erste Ergebnisse. Soziale Welt 28: 413–23.
- (1978), Angewandte Sozialberichterstattung: Das SPES-Indikatorensystem. In: Neuere Entwicklungen in den Wirtschaftswissenschaften. Schriften des Vereins für Socialpolitik, ns vol. 98. Berlin: Duncker & Humblot, 689–716. Englisch: Applied Social Reporting: The SPES Social Indicators System. Social Indicators Research 6 (1979): 397–419; reprinted in: Charles Taylor, ed. (1980), Indicator Systems for Political, Economic, and Social Analysis. Königstein: A. Hain, 39–68.
- (1979), Modernization and Welfare Development: The Case of Germany. Social Science Information 18: 219–246.
- (1979), Lebensbedingungen und wahrgenommene Lebensqualität. In: Joachim Matthes, ed., Sozialer Wandel in Westeuropa. Frankfurt a.M. and New York: Campus, 767—90.
- (1980), The SPES Social Indicators System in Comparative Perspective. In: Alexander Szalai and Frank M. Andrews, eds, The Quality of Life: Comparative Studies. Beverly Hills: Sage, 249–69.
- (1981), Wohlfahrtsstaat und Wohlfahrtsproduktion. In: Lothar Albertin and Werner Link, eds, Politische Parteien auf dem Weg zur parlamentarischen Demokratie in Deutschland: Entwicklungslinien bis zur Gegenwart. [Erich Matthias zum 60. Geburtstag gewidmet]. Düsseldorf: Droste, 379–400.
- (1981), Zur Theorie und Messung von side-effects. In: Joachim Matthes, ed., Lebenswelt und soziale Probleme. Frankfurt a.M. and New York: Campus, 275—87.
- (1982), Gegenwartsprobleme und Entwicklungstendenzen westeuropäischer Gesellschaften. IHS-Journal, Institut für Höhere Studien Wien 6: 121–33.
- (1982), Die Wohlfahrtsentwicklung in Deutschland seit der Mitte des 19. Jahrhunderts. In: Werner Conze and M. Rainer Lepsius, eds, Sozialgeschichte der Bundesrepublik Deutschland: Beiträge zum Kontinuitätsproblem. Stuttgart: Klett-Cotta, 67–85. (Industrielle Welt, vol. 34).
- (1982), Social Partnership: Corporative Pluralism in Austria. In: Kurt Steiner, ed., Tradition and Innovation in Contemporary Austria. Palo Alto: Sposs, 152–59.
- (1983), Entwicklungsdilemmas und Innovationspotentiale in modernen Gesellschaften. In: Joachim Matthes, ed., Arbeitsgesellschaft in der Krise? Frankfurt a.M. and New York: Campus, 293—308. Also in: Harald Enke et al., eds (1983), Struktur und Dynamik der Wirtschaft: Festschrift für Karl Brandt. Freiburg: Haufe, 235–52. Englisch: Developmental Dilemmas and Innovative Potential in Modern Societies. Working paper, no. 97, Sonderforschungsbereich 3 Frankfurt a.M./Mannheim, 1983.
- (1983), Die Pluralisierung der Lebensstile: Neue Muster des Lebens- und Familienzyklus, Alte und neue Linien der sozialen Schichtung. In: Zukunftsperspektiven gesellschaftlicher Entwicklungen. Bericht im Auftrag der Landesregierung von Baden-Württemberg. Stuttgart, 56–73.
- (1983), Gesellschaftliche und kulturelle Entwicklungen. In: Zukunftschancen eines Industrielandes. Kongress der der Landesregierung von Baden-Württemberg. Dokumentation. Stuttgart, 31–5.
- (1984), Weiterbildung: der „vierte Bildungssektor“, Individuelle Entfaltung versus soziale Unterschiede. In: Weiterbildung: Herausforderung und Chance. Bericht im Auftrag der Landesregierung von Baden-Württemberg. Stuttgart, 27–36, 45–50.
- (1984), Rahmenbedingungen der Weiterbildung. In: Zukunftschancen eines Industrielandes. Kongress der der Landesregierung von Baden-Württemberg. Dokumentation. Stuttgart, 26–30.
- (1984), Welfare Production: Public vs. Private. Social Indicators Research 14: 263–274. German: Zur Theorie der Wohlfahrtsproduktion: Öffentliche und private Aktivitäten in Perspektive. In: E. Wille, ed., Konzeptionelle Probleme öffentlicher Planung. Frankfurt a.M.: Lang, 1–19.
- (together with Wolfgang Glatzer) (1984), Die Lebensqualität der Bundesbürger. Beilage zur Wochenzeitung das Parlament, B 44/84, 3 November 1984, 3–25.
- (1985), Der Zugang der Wissenschaft zur statistischen Information: Forderung und Realität. In: Statistisches Bundesamt, ed., Datennotstand und Datenschutz. Stuttgart: Kohlhammer Verlag, 38–49.
- (1985), Weiterbildung und Politikberatung. In: Burkhart Lutz, ed., Soziologie und gesellschaftliche Entwicklung. Frankfurt a.M. and New York: Campus, 278–81.
- (1986), Development, Structure and Prospects of the German Social State. In: Rei Shiratori and Richard Rose, eds, Welfare State: East and West. Oxford and New York: Oxford University Press, 126–55.
- (1986), Zur Diskussion um Krise und Innovationschancen in westlichen Demokratien. In: Max Kaase, ed., Politische Wissenschaft und politische Ordnung: Analysen zu Theorie und Empirie demokratischer Regierungsweise. Festschrift für Rudolf Wildenmann. Opladen: Westdeutscher Verlag, 52–60. Modified as: Innovationschancen moderner Gesellschaften. In: Gießener Universitätsblätter, no. 2/1985: 21–25, and in: Loccumer Protokolle, 3/1985: 41–53.
- (1986), Die deutsche Version des Wohlfahrtsstaates. In: Klaus Hanau, Reinhard Hujer and Werner Neubauer, eds, Wirtschafts- und Sozialstatistik: Empirische Grundlagen und politische Entscheidungen. Heinz Grohmann zum 65. Geburtstag. Göttingen: Vandenhoeck & Ruprecht, 379–403.
- (1986), Wandel, sozialer. In: Bernhard Schäfers, ed., Grundbegriffe der Soziologie. Opladen: Leske & Budrich, 365–70.
- (1986), Innovationschancen der westeuropäischen Gesellschaften. In: Soziale Welt, special vol. 4, Johannes Berger, ed., Die Moderne – Kontinuitäten und Zäsuren, 167–79.
- (1988), Sozialer Wandel. In: Görres-Gesellschaft, ed., Staatslexikon: Recht, Wirtschaft, Gesellschaft; in 5 Bänden. Görres-Gesellschaft zur Pflege der Wissenschaft. 7, completely revised ed. vol. 4: Naturschutz und Landschaftspflege – Sozialhilfe. Freiburg et al.: Herder, cols. ???–???.
- (together with Sigrid Breuer and Jürgen Hampel) (1987), Technikfolgen für Haushaltsorganisation und Familienbeziehungen. In: Burkart Lutz, ed., Technik und sozialer Wandel: Verhandlungen des 23. Deutscher Soziologentags in Hamburg 1986. Frankfurt a.M. and New York: Campus, 220–32.
- (1988), Individualisierung und Sicherheit: Einige Anmerkungen aus soziologischer Sicht. In: Gabriele Rolf, P. Gerd Spahn and Gert Wagner, eds, Sozialvertrag und Sicherung: Zur ökonomischen Theorie staatlicher Versicherungs- und Umverteilungssysteme. Frankfurt a.M. and New York: Campus, 371–80.
- (ed.) (1991), Die Modernisierung moderner Gesellschaften: Verhandlungen des 25. Deutschen Soziologentages in Frankfurt am Main 1990. Frankfurt a.M. and New York: Campus.
- (1994), Einige Materialien zu Gesellschaft und Demokratie in Deutschland. In: Hansgert Peisert et al., eds, Gesellschaft, Demokratie und Lebenschancen: Festschrift für Ralf Dahrendorf. Stuttgart: Deutsche Verlagsanstalt, 291–312.
- (1995), Die Wirkungen wirtschaftlicher Veränderungen auf die soziale Wohlfahrt und die Gesundheit. In: Peter Nahamowitz and Otwin Massing, eds, Politik – Verfassung – Gesellschaft: Traditionslinien und Entwicklungsperspektiven: Otwin Massing zum 60. Geburtstag. Baden-Baden: Nomos-Verlagsgesellschaft, 199–212.
- (1995), Modernisierungstheorien in der Transformationsforschung. In: Klaus von Beyme and Claus Offe, eds, Politische Theorien in der Ära der Transformation. Opladen: Westdeutscher Verlag, 169–81.
- (1996), Die Modernisierungstheorie und unterschiedliche Pfade der gesellschaftlichen Entwicklung. Leviathan Baden-Baden: Nomos, 24 (March 1996) 1: 63–77.
- (1997), Die deutsche Transformation: ein Modernisierungsprozess mit unterschiedlichen Geschwindigkeiten in Ost und West. In: Roland Lhotta et al., eds, Deutsche und europäische Verfassungsgeschichte: sozial- und rechtswissenschaftliche Zugänge: Symposium zum 65. Geburtstag von Hans Boldt. Baden-Baden: Nomos-Verlagsgesellschaft, 91–100.
- (together with Roland Habich) (1999), Die Wohlfahrtsentwicklung in der Bundesrepublik Deutschland 1949 bis 1999. In: Max Kaase und Günther Schmid; Wissenschaftszentrum Berlin für Sozialforschung, eds, Eine lernende Demokratie: 50 Jahre Bundesrepublik Deutschland. Berlin: Ed. Sigma, 1999, 285–314. (WZB-Jahrbuch, 1999).
- (2000), Wie kann man die deutsche Vereinigung bilanzieren? In: Heinz-Herbert Noll and Roland Habich, eds, Vom Zusammenwachsen einer Gesellschaft: Analysen zur Angleichung der Lebensverhältnisse in Deutschland. Frankfurt a.M. and New York: Campus. (Soziale Indikatoren, vol. 21). Reprinted with the same title as: Mannheimer Vorträge, no. 5. Mannheim: Mannheimer Zentrum für Europäische Sozialforschung, 2000. In Englisch: How to Evaluate German Unification? Berlin : Wissenschaftszentrum Berlin für Sozialforschung, dep. Sozialstruktur und Sozialberichterstattung im Forschungsschwerpunkt III, 2000. (Veröffentlichung der Abteilung no. 00,404).
- (together with Roland Habich) (2002), „Neues wagen – am Alten und Bewährten festhalten“: Wertewandel, Sozialstruktur und Sozialberichterstattung. In: Dieter Fuchs et al., eds, Bürger und Demokratie in Ost und West: Studien zur politischen Kultur und zum politischen Prozess; Festschrift für Hans-Dieter Klingemann. Wiesbaden: Westdeutscher Verlag, 108–27.
- (8th ed. 2003), Wandel, sozialer. In: Bernhard Schäfers, ed., Grundbegriffe der Soziologie. Opladen: Leske & Budrich, 427–33.
- (2004), Modernization Theory – in the Non-western World. Welt-Trends: Zeitschrift für internationale Politik. Potsdam: Welt-Trends, Universität Potsdam, 12 (Autumn 2004) 44: 100–107.

=== Working papers, expert opinions, hectographs ===
- (1961), Die Literatur einer Subkultur. Soziologische Diplomarbeit, Institut für Sozialforschung, J. W. Goethe-Universität, Frankfurt a.M.
- (1966), On the Theory of Change and the Analysis of War. Paper Presented on the VIth World Congress of Sociology, Evian.
- (1967), Materialien zur Analyse des sozialen Wandels. Habilitation thesis, University of Constance.
- (1967), Zur Soziologie des Nationalsozialismus. Habilitationsvortrag. University of Constance.
- (together with Hans Jürgen Krupp) (1972), Die Rolle alternativer Wohlstandsindikatoren. Gutachten für den Sachverständigenrat zur Begutachtung der gesamtwirtschaftlichen Entwicklung. Frankfurt a.M.
- (together with others) (1976), Soziologie und politische Wissenschaft. In: Deutsche Forschungsgemeinschaft, Aufgaben und Finanzierung V („Grauer Plan“ 1976–1978). Boppard: Boldt, 68–77.
- (1977), Komponenten der Wohlfahrt: Pretest 1976. SPES-Arbeitspapiere no. 78. Frankfurt a.M.
- (1979), Neue Daten für eine historische Sozialforschung. VASMA-Arbeitspapiere no. 6. Mannheim.
- (1979), Mikroanalytische Grundlagen der Gesellschaftspolitik. Forschungsbericht der Universität Mannheim, 427–432.
- (together with others) (1981), Der Wohlfahrtssurvey 1980 – Erste Ergebnisse. In: W. Schulte, eds, Soziologie in der Gesellschaft, 20. Deutscher Soziologentag. University of Bremen, 150–5.
- (1981), Einleitung in das Programm des Sonderforschungsbereichs. Sonderforschungsbereich 3 Frankfurt a.M./Mannheim.
- (together with others) (1982), Erste Ergebnisse der Wiederholungsbefragung 1978/1980. Sonderforschungsbereich 3 Frankfurt a.M./Mannheim.
- (1982), Experiences in Private Social Reporting. Document Prepared for the OECD Social Affairs Division.
- (1982), Soziale Indikatoren in der Umfrageforschung. In: Vorträge zur Markt- und Sozialforschung, no. 2. Offenbach: Bundesverband der Marktforscher, 18–36.
- (1982), On the Concept and Measurement of Welfare Production. Paper Prepared at the Xth World Congress of Sociology. Mexico City.
- (1984), Umfragereplikationen als soziale Indikatoren. Beitrag zu einer jugendsoziologischen Konferenz der Werner-Reimers-Stiftung, 12 March 1984.
- (1984), Wissenschaftsförderung durch Stiftungen. Rede zur Preisverleihung der Arthur-Burkhardt-Stiftung, 19 October 1984.
- (1985), Soziale Mindestsicherung unter neuen gesellschaftlichen Anforderungen. Beitrag zu einem Kolloquium der Politischen Akademie der Konrad-Adenauer-Stiftung, Bonn 22 February 1985.
- (1985), Stellungnahme zum Mikrozensusgesetz. Unterlage für die Anhörung des Innenausschusses des Deutschen Bundestages, 25 February 1985.
- (with colleagues) (1985), Die Pluralisierung der Lebensstile. Gutachten für das Bundeskanzleramt, May 1985.
- (with colleagues) (1985), Individualisierung und Sicherheit. Gutachten für das Bundeskanzleramt, November 1985.
- (1985), The Future of the Welfare State: the German Case. Paper Prepared for the Conference on "The Experience of Welfare State and Its Future", Tokyo, 27–29 August 1984. Sonderforschungsbereich 3, Arbeitspapier no. 148. Frankfurt a.M. and Mannheim.
- (with colleagues) (1986), Lebensqualität der Wohnbevölkerung in der Bundesrepublik. Gutachten für das Bundeskanzleramt, March 1986.
- (1986), Innovationschancen und Weiterbildung in der modernen Gesellschaft: [Sitzung des Kreistags am 28. Januar 1986 im Neuen Schloss Meersburg]. Friedrichshafen: Landratsamt Bodenseekreis. (Probleme und Perspektiven am See, no. 8).
- (1987), On Social Innovations. Stanford University, January 1987. With the same title published as: Sonderforschungsbereich 3, Arbeitspapier no. 254. Frankfurt a.M. and Mannheim.
- (1989), Die Sozialstruktur der Bundesrepublik in den 1980er Jahren. Berlin: WZB. WZB-Papers, 89; 101.
- (ed.) (1990), Zur Lage der sozialwissenschaftlichen Forschung in der ehemaligen DDR: wissenschaftliche Interessen, Forschungserfahrungen, Strukturprobleme, Kooperationswege; Konferenzbericht. Berlin: WZB. WZB-Papers, 90,8.
- (1990), Modernisierung und Modernisierungstheorien. Berlin: WZB, Arbeitsgruppe Sozialberichterstattung. Papers/ WZB, Arbeitsgruppe Sozialberichterstattung, 90,4.
- (1992), Die Transformation in der ehemaligen DDR und die soziologische Theorie der Modernisierung. Berlin: WZB, Arbeitsgruppe Sozialberichterstattung. Papers/ WZB, Arbeitsgruppe Sozialberichterstattung, 92,104. With the same title published as: Gastvortrag; öffentlicher Vortrag im Rahmen der Fachbeiratssitzung des Max-Planck-Instituts für Gesellschaftsforschung in Köln, 23 April 1992. Köln: MPIFG, 1992.
- (1999), Social Reporting in the 1970s and 1990s. Berlin: WZB. (Veröffentlichungen der Abteilung Sozialstruktur und Sozialberichterstattung des Forschungsschwerpunktes Sozialer Wandel, Institutionen und Vermittlungsprozesse des Wissenschaftszentrums Berlin für Sozialforschung, no. 99/404).
- (2003), Modernisierung und Wohlfahrtsentwicklung: WZB-Vorlesung, 17. Dezember 2002. (WZB-Vorlesungen, no. 5).
