= Franz Rothenbacher =

German sociologist

Franz Rothenbacher (born 14 December 1954 in Schelklingen, West Germany) is a German sociologist.

== Academic career ==
Rothenbacher studied sociology at the University of Mannheim from 1975 until 1981. For the next year and a half he was research assistant at the special research group 3 Microanalytic Foundations of Social Policy, Frankfurt a.M. and Mannheim (Sonderforschungsbereich 3 Mikroanalytische Grundlagen der Gesellschaftspolitik). From mid-1982 until 1988 Rothenbacher worked as lecturer and research fellow at the chair for sociology of Wolfgang Zapf at the Faculty for Social Sciences of the University of Mannheim. In 1988 he received a philosophers doctoral degree in sociology. Since 1989 Rothenbacher is a social researcher at the Mannheim Centre for European Social Research (MZES) at the infrastructural department Eurodata.

== Research ==
Rothenbacher in the beginning was interested in the long-term analysis of social change in Germany, also known as modernization. He analysed central long-term macrosocial processes of change in the social subsystems of family, health, housing, and in a cross-sectional perspective the structures of social inequality. He intended to apply the perspective of social reporting or of social indicators to historical processes and structures.

At the Mannheim Centre for European Social Research (MZES) Rothenbacher contributed to the implementation of the infrastructural department Eurodata and the European statistics library. The research tradition of modernization (Peter Flora) and of the territorial structuring of Europe (Stein Rokkan) formed the basis for extensive long-term and comparative data collections for the European countries which appear in the data handbook series The Societies of Europe. For this series Rothenbacher wrote both volumes on the West European and the volume on the East European population.

Other research interests of Rothenbacher include European social reporting, the comparative analysis of the European public services, and finally local historical research, as well.

== Selected works ==
- Soziale Ungleichheit im Modernisierungsprozeß des 19. und 20. Jahrhunderts. (Social Inequality during the Modernization Process of the 19th and 20th Centuries). Frankfurt/New York: Campus Verlag, 1989. (395 pp.)
- (in co-operation with Peter Flora, Franz Kraus and Heinz-Herbert Noll) Social Statistics and Social Reporting in and for Europe. Bonn: InformationsZentrum Sozialwissenschaften (IZ), 1994 (Europe in Comparison – A Series of Guidebooks for the Social Sciences, ed. by Heinrich Best and Peter Flora, vol. 1). (332 pp.).
- Historische Haushalts- und Familienstatistik von Deutschland 1815–1990. (Historical Household and Family Statistics of Germany 1815–1990). Frankfurt/New York: Campus Verlag, 1997. (383 pp.).
- Statistical Sources for Social Research on Western Europe: A Guide to Social Statistics. Opladen: Leske and Budrich, 1998 (Europe in Comparison – A Series of Guidebooks for the Social Sciences, ed. by Heinrich Best and Peter Flora, vol. 6). (399 pp.).
- The European Population 1850–1945. Houndmills, Basingstoke, Hampshire, UK and New York, NY: Palgrave Macmillan, 2002 (The Societies of Europe, vol. 3). (xxviii+846 pp.+CD-ROM). Reprint 2006.
- The European Population since 1945. Houndmills, Basingstoke, Hampshire, UK and New York, NY: Palgrave Macmillan, 2005 (The Societies of Europe, vol. 4). (xxx+1,030 pp.+CD-ROM). Reprint 2006.
- The Central and East European Population since 1850. Houndmills, Basingstoke, Hampshire, UK und New York, NY: Palgrave Macmillan, 2013 (The Societies of Europe, vol. 5). (xxxii+1,491 pp.).
- (with Georg Fertig) chapter 2 ‘Bevölkerung, Haushalte und Familien’. In Thomas Rahlf (ed.), Deutschland in Daten: Zeitreihen zur Historischen Statistik. Bonn: Bundeszentrale für Politische Bildung / bpb, 2015, pp. 30–45. ISBN 978-3-8389-7133-9. Second, updated (time series to 2018) and extended edition 2022. An English edition of this text with the title Population, Households and Families can be found on the project homepage.
- (with Georg Fertig) chapter 2 ‘Bevölkerung, Haushalte, Familien’. In: Thomas Rahlf (ed.), Dokumentation zum Zeitreihensatz für Deutschland, 1834–2012. Documentation of the German Time Series Dataset, 1834-2012. Documentation for: Thomas Rahlf (Hrsg.), Deutschland in Daten: Zeitreihen der Historischen Statistik. Bonn: Bundeszentrale für Politische Bildung. Version 29 Juni 2015. Historical Social Research – Historische Sozialforschung, HSR Trans 26 (2015) v01. Köln: GESIS, 2015, pp. 69–130. doi:10.12759/hsr.trans.26.v01.2015.
