= Mannheim School of Social Sciences =

University in Mannheim, Germany

- Type: Public
- Established: 1963
- Academic affiliations: Duke University; Harvard University; University of Michigan; Princeton University; University of Chicago; National Science Foundation; Washington University in St. Louis
- Dean: Michael Diehl
- Location: Mannheim, Baden-Württemberg, Germany
- Website: www.home.sowi.uni-mannheim.de

The Mannheim School of Social Sciences (MSSS) is among the oldest of the five schools comprising the University of Mannheim, located in Mannheim, Baden-Württemberg, Germany. The School of Social Sciences, established in 1963, comprises the fields of political science, sociology and psychology with an academic staff of 36 professors and 150 additional scientists. The social sciences at the University of Mannheim have an excellent international reputation, reflected by rankings, awards and third-party funds.

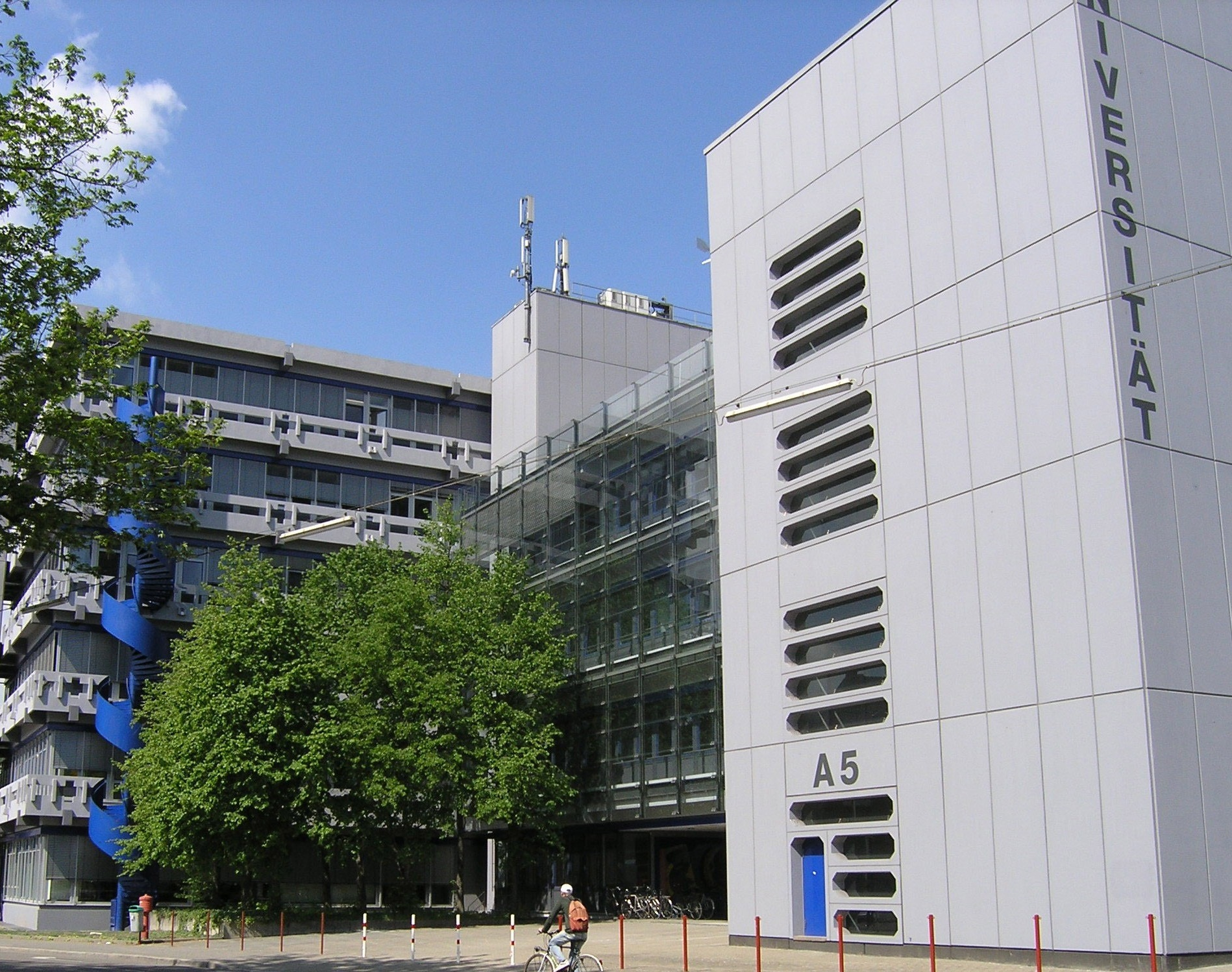
The Mannheim School of Social Sciences main building A5

== Department of Sociology ==
The Department of Sociology at the School of Social Sciences is renowned for its strength in empirical and analytical research, and for using innovative quantitative techniques in its research design.

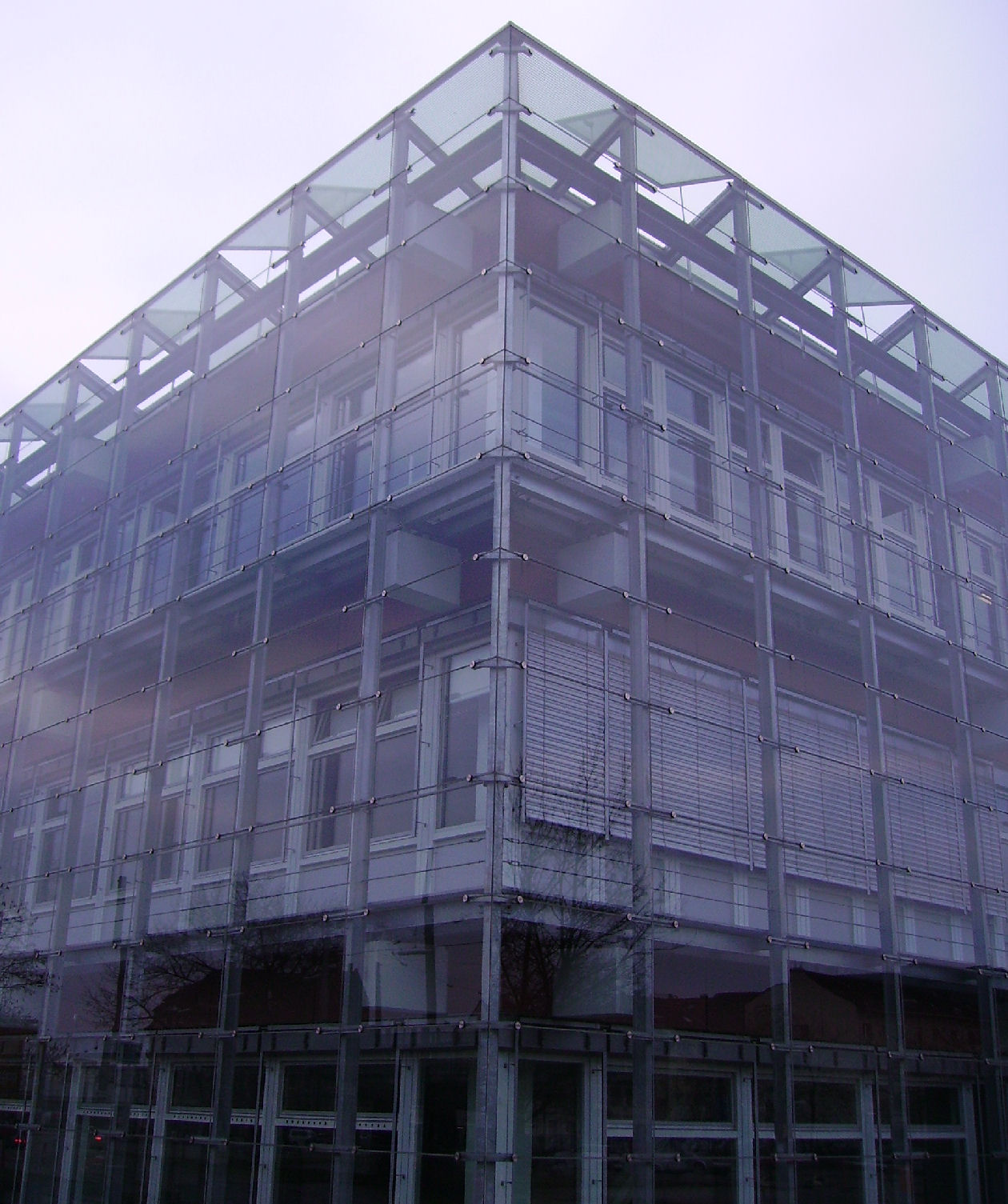
Glass Cube belonging to the School of Social Sciences

The Department's main areas of focus in research and teaching consist of Sociological Theory, Comparative Sociology, Stratification Research, Economic Sociology, Social Psychology, and Quantitative Research methods. The department maintains close cooperation with the Mannheim Centre for European Social Research (MZES) and the GESIS Leibniz Institute for the Social Sciences. Since 2014 the Mannheim School of Social Sciences is the first and only European partner institution of the EITM Summer Institutes and provides advancing theoretical and empirical research training in form of a summer school to scholars, together with its US partners Princeton University, Harvard University, University of Michigan, University of Chicago, Duke University, Washington University in St. Louis and the National Science Foundation

== Department of Psychology ==
The Department of Psychology has developed into one of the leading research and teaching institutions in Germany, focusing mainly on the research areas of Industrial and Organizational Psychology, Consumer Psychology, Social Psychology and Cognitive Psychology. Recently a new chair for Consumer Psychology has been established and a collaborative research center on decision-making opened. Further research is also being conducted at the Otto-Selz-Institute (Mannheim Centre for Work and Health), which focuses on the impact of negative influences at the workplace.

== Department of Political Science ==
The Department of Political Science has an emphasis on the use of quantitative and analytical methods in its research on political phenomena. The Department's main areas of focus in research and teaching are Comparative Politics and International Relations, with emphasis on Political Behavior, Political Economy, International Conflict, and German and European Politics. The research activities of the Department of Political Science are complemented by the Mannheim Centre for European Social Research (MZES) and the Collaborative Research Centre SFB 884 "Political Economy of Reforms", The Department of Political Science was one of the first universities in Germany to introduce a systematic and international study program by offering Bachelor, Master and Ph.D (doctoral) degree programs. Furthermore the department holds close partnerships and exchange programs with Washington University in St. Louis, Johns Hopkins University, and University of Milan.

== See also ==
- Mannheim Business School
- Education in Germany
- List of universities in Germany
