= Albert Kahn =

Albert Kahn may refer to:

- Albert Kahn (architect) (1869–1942), American architect
- Albert Kahn (banker) (1860–1940), French banker, philanthropist and photograph collector
- Albert E. Kahn (1912–1979), American journalist

== See also ==
- Alfred Kahn (disambiguation)
