= Peg Belson =

Margaret "Peg" Belson, MBE (1921–2012) was a British health care campaigner who made voluntary contributions over 60 years, in the UK and abroad, in the field of children's welfare in hospitals, including the establishment of the Action for Sick Children Association. She was a founding member of the European Association for Children in Hospital (EACH). She was a holder of BA (Syd) and PhD (Hon).

== Early life and family ==
Margaret Belson (née Harris) was born in England in 1921 before emigrating to Australia at an early age, where she qualified as a teacher. She met her husband, William Belson, during the Second World War and they moved to London in 1951. Their first child, Jane, was born that year, followed by Louise, Ross and Bruce.

== Inspiration ==
In 1959 the UK's Ministry of Health published the Platt Report requiring hospitals to implement major changes in the non-medical care of children in hospital. It made 54 recommendations, the most significant being that visiting to all children should be unrestricted, that mothers should be able to stay with young children and that the training of medical and nursing staff should include the emotional and social needs of children and families.

== Early work ==
Peg Belson was one of the Battersea mothers who heeded his call and under his guidance set up a group, initially called Mother Care for Children in Hospital, which in 1965 changed to NAWCH – the National Association for the Welfare of Children in Hospital. Within a few years NAWCH was a UK-wide organisation with over fifty branches, a Central Office and a Government grant. During the past 50 years going into hospital for children has changed beyond recognition. In the main children are cared for by qualified staff on children's wards where parents are welcome at any time, sleep near their child and take part in their care, hospital play specialists help to make the experience more meaningful and endurable and wards are bright and suitably decorated. With her colleagues Peg Belson played a significant role in helping to bring about these changes. She was a committee member and office-bearer in NAWCH (now Action for Sick Children), a member of official enquiries and represented Action for Sick Children on other national organisations. As a lecturer and writer and as a health authority member she was able to persuade others to take up the cause. She carried out many national surveys of hospital facilities for children, which gained wide press coverage and formed part of official reports. These surveys included facilities for parents, numbers of children's trained doctors, nurses and hospital play specialists and numbers of children being nursed in adult wards as well as the availability of children's emergency services, dedicated adolescent care and of education for sick children. In addition to helping to improve care in the UK she helped to introduce similar programmes for family involvement and play to other countries by visiting and teaching in hospitals overseas and by arranging teaching visits to UK hospitals for enthusiastic groups of overseas staff. These contacts included Australia, New Zealand, the Netherlands, Malta, Finland, West Germany, Denmark, Japan, China, Kuwait, the Czech Republic, Poland and Bosnia. She was associated with the setting up of EACH, the European Association for Children in Hospital in 1992, the development of the EACH Charter for Children in Hospital. She represented Action for Sick Children on EACH and was currently its secretary. From 1964 she was associated with the development of play in hospital. With Dr Charlotte Williamson she established the Play in Hospital Liaison Committee and taught on three of the training programmes for Hospital Play Specialists. She was a vice-president of the National Association for Hospital Play Staff and Advisor to Action for Sick Children. She assisted in the programme of family-centred care and hospital play in the Czech Republic since 1992.

== Work with children with HIV/AIDS ==
Her early interest, gained in the US, in children with HIV led her to join CWAC – the Children With AIDS Charity – at its foundation in 1992, chairing it from 2000 to 2010, steering it to become a very effective source of help for the many UK children infected and affected with HIV/AIDS. Medical advances have seen HIV become more a chronic than a terminal illness but social care is far behind. These children may, from an early age, experience extreme poverty, stigma, bereavement, adoption and fostering, while maintaining a strict medication regime with long or short-term side effects and enduring hospital stays while the need to maintain complete confidentiality regarding their health status can bring social isolation. CWAC offers these children and their families financial help, respite breaks, work experience and transport to hospital, provides sexual health programmes in schools and clubs, publishes a journal and runs a resource and campaign centre. Other interests include child accident prevention, facilities for under-fives and programmes for disabled children. She served on health authorities and community health councils and undertook other patient-representational roles during nearly sixty years of fulfilling voluntary endeavour for children and young people.

== Honours ==
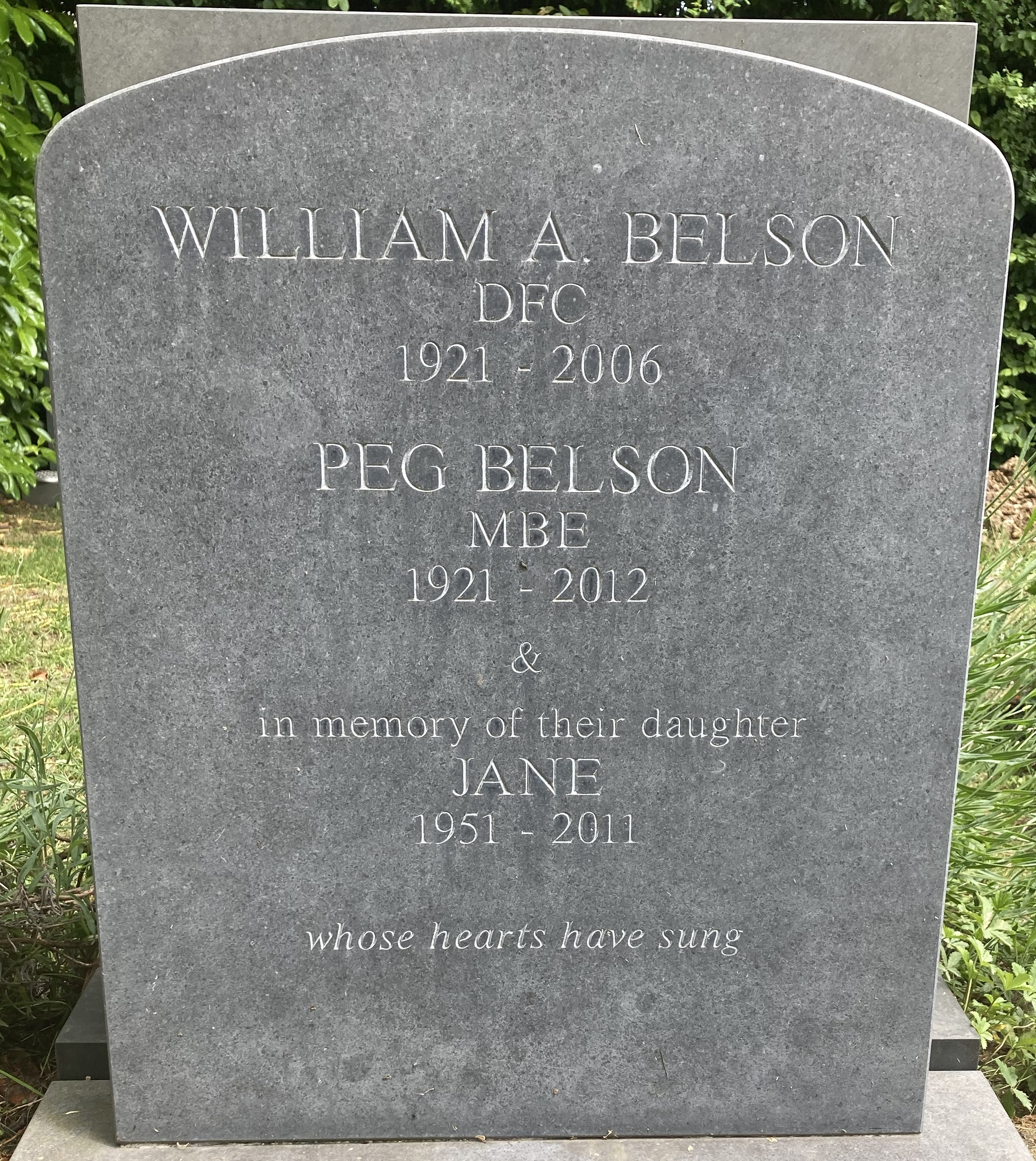
Grave of Peg Belson in Highgate Cemetery

At her death she was vice-chair of USUKAA and was closely involved in the moves to change the NHS. She was awarded an MBE in 1973, elected an Honorary Fellow of the Royal College of Paediatrics and Child Health in 1993 and was awarded an honorary PhD in 2003 by Wheelock College in Boston with whom she ran a summer school in London from 1978 to 2005. In 2011 she was presented with the inaugural USUKAA Lifetime Achievement Award. In October 2012, she was posthumously bestowed with the Silver Jan Masaryk Honorary Medal by the Minister of Foreign Affairs of the Czech Republic, Mr. Karel Schwarzenberg, for her exceptional contribution to the advancement of care for hospitalized children in the Czech Republic. The medal was presented to Ms Louise Belson, her daughter, by His Excellency Michael Žantovský, the Czech Ambassador, at a ceremony that took place at the Embassy of the Czech Republic in London. The initiative for the award came from the Klicek Foundation , of which Peg Belson was a friend and advocate.
