= Foundation for Child Development =

- Formation: 1899
- Type: Non-profit
- Headquarters: New York, NY, United States
- Chairman: H. Melvin Ming
- Key people: Vivian L. Gadsden; Marilou Hyson; Jill Baker,
- Revenue: $4,065,317 (2015)
- Expenses: $6,714,759 (2015)
- Website: www.fcd-us.org

The Foundation for Child Development (FCD) is a United States-based non-profit organization dedicated to supporting child development through early learning experiences, education, promoting children's economic and physical well-being, and advancing social justice for young children.

== History ==
The organization began in 1899 when a group led by Mabel Irving Jones, a concerned citizen of New York City, established a class for disabled children at the Children's Aid Society. In 1900, the Auxiliary Board of the New York City Children’s Aid Society was incorporated, and in 1908, the organization became the Association for the Aid of Crippled Children. By 1930, more than 30,000 children benefited from the organization's work. During World War II, they also helped injured soldiers. The organization became a grantmaking organization in 1944 with an $11 million donation from the estate of Milo M. Belding, a silk manufacturer and banker, in honor of his late wife. In 1972, the organization changed its name to the Foundation for Child Development to reflect its focus on child development and preventing child poverty. In the 1970s, the Foundation worked to translate scholarly research to government policies by supporting initiatives at George Washington University, Vanderbilt University, and the University of California, Los Angeles. They also published reports, including The State of the Child: New York City by Trude Lash and Heidi Sigal and the National Survey of Children directed by Nicholas Zill. By 1980, the Foundation's annual assets were around $30 million and annual grants were approximately $2 million.
