= Egbert Jahn =

German political scientist and historian

Egbert Kurt Jahn (born 26 May 1941 in Berlin) is a German political scientist, contemporary historian and peace researcher and is emeritus professor at the University of Mannheim.

== Life ==
After his Abitur in Wiesbaden, Jahn studied history – specialising in East European history – political science, geography and educational theory between 1961 and 1969 in Marburg (under amongst others Peter Scheibert, Wolfgang Abendroth, Ernst-Otto Czempiel, Karl Christ, Walter Heinemeyer, Carl Schott, Kurt Scharlau and Leonhard Froese) and briefly also in Berlin and Bratislava. After his state examination in 1968 he graduated in East European history in 1969 under Peter Scheibert in Marburg.

At the beginning of 1968, while still a student in Marburg, he set up the High School Union for Peace and Conflict Research (originally the High School Union for Interdisciplinary Polemology) and was one of the first members of the Association of Peace and Conflict Research (AFK), which was also founded in 1968. After a brief period in 1969/70 as scientific assistant to Czempiel in Marburg, he went with the latter to Frankfurt am Main and in 1971 became the first research fellow at the Peace Research Institute Frankfurt (PRIF, Hessische Stiftung Friedens- und Konfliktforschung, HSFK). Here from 1974 until the end of 1990, he became the director of the Research Group “Socialist States”. In 1975 he was offered the Professorship in Socio-Economic Structures, Institutions and Foreign Policy of Socialist Countries and then the Professorship of Political Science and Political Sociology at the Johann Wolfgang Goethe University in Frankfurt am Main He received a further offer in 1993, in succession to Hermann Weber, of the Chair of Political Science and Contemporary History at the University of Mannheim until September 2005. In 1992. while still in Frankfurt, he founded the Research Unit for Conflict and Cooperation Structures in Eastern Europe, Southeast Europe and Eurasia (FKKS) called the Mannheim here-named the Research Area for Conflict and Cooperation Structures in Eastern Europe. At the Mannheim Centre for European Social Research (MZES), he first headed a department and then later on until 2009 directed the Research Area “New Democracies and Conflict Resolution”.

In 1986/7 Jahn took up a visiting Professorship at the University of Copenhagen, where he was active in the establishment of the Centre of Peace and Conflict Research. In 1988 he was a visiting professor at the University of California, Irvine. In September 1993 he gave lectures at Vilnius University.

Since May 2004 he has been holding lectures on “Political Controversies from a Contemporary Perspective”. Here, Jahn has turned his attention to a wider public in the form of students of all faculties and of the older generation (Studies for senior citizens, University of the Third Age). Starting with this in Mannheim, he has continued this series at the University of Frankfurt since 2009.

== Memberships ==
Jahn was frequently on the board of directors of the Peace Research Institute Frankfurt (HSFK) and in 1975/6 and 1981/2 was the director in charge. Between 1996 and 1999, he was a member of the committee of the Mannheim Centre for European Social Research. He was frequently a member of the Council and the Board of Trustees of the German Society for Peace and Conflict Research (DGFK) from 1979 to 1983. In the German Association of Political Science (DVPW) during the 1970s, he directed the working group on “Socialist States”. At the beginning of the 1970s, he was also on the working group for “Civilian Defence” in the Federation of German Scientists” (VDW). He was for some years on the steering committee of the Association for Peace and Conflict Studies (AFK) and from 1977 to 1979 was Chairman. In the 1980s he initiated a working group on Peace Research in the German Trade Union Confederation (DGB) in Hesse and was on the Council of the International Peace Research Association from 1986 to 1989.

== Public activities ==
Though never a member of a political party, Jahn was nevertheless a member in the 1970s and 1980s of the Socialist Bureau, an independent democratic socialist union, where he was part of the editorial team producing their monthly journal “Left. Socialist Newspaper”.

He was often a consultant or commentator on events and working groups of the German Social Democratic Party (SPD) and the Friedrich Ebert Foundation, subsequently also for the Green Party, occasionally also at events of the Christian Democratic Union (CDU) and the Free Democrats (FDP) and in addition for various organisations of conscientious objectors and the Peace Movement. He also gave many lectures in the Protestant Academies of Tutzing, Arnoldshain and Loccum, in the Leadership Centre of the Bundeswehr in Koblenz and to the Trade Union Confederation. In the 1980s he was a visiting teacher at the Labour Academy (Akademie der Arbeit) in Frankfurt am Main.

Jahn received an invitation to visit the German Democratic Republic (GDR) in March 1985, when he was wanting to set out on a long-prepared excursion to Leipzig. Due to his activities in the AFK, he was noted in the state security files of the GDR as a disruptive and divisive influence within the Peace Movement, above all probably because following his criticism of the arms build-up by NATO, he had also criticised the invasion of Afghanistan by Soviet troops, as it happened in the Catholic newspaper “Public Forum”.

== Works ==
In addition to around 200 contributions to journals and omnibus editions, his main works are as follows:

- Die Deutschen in der Slowakei in den Jahren 1918-1929. Ein Beitrag zur Nationalitätenproblematik. R. Oldenbourg, München/Wien 1971, ISBN 3-486-43321-0.
- Kommunismus - und was dann? Zur Bürokratisierung und Militarisierung des Systems der Nationalstaaten. Rowohlt, Reinbek 1974, ISBN 3-499-11653-7.
- Eine Kritik der sowjet-marxistischen Lehre vom „gerechten Krieg“. In: Reiner Steinweg (Red.): Der gerechte Krieg: Christentum, Islam, Marxismus (Friedensanalysen 12). Suhrkamp, Frankfurt 1980, ISBN 3-518-11017-9, pp. 163–185.
- Der Einfluß der Ideologie auf die sowjetische Außen- und Rüstungspolitik. In: Osteuropa 36. (5, 6, 7/1986), ISSN 0030-6428, pp. 356–374, 447-461, 509-521.
- Bürokratischer Sozialismus: Chancen der Demokratisierung? Einführung in die politischen Systeme kommunistischer Länder. Fischer, Frankfurt 1982, ISBN 3-596-26633-5.
- (in cooperation with Pierre Lemaitre and Ole Waever) European Security - Problems of Research on Non-Military Aspects. Copenhagen: Centre of Peace and Conflict Research 1987, ISBN 87-89180-00-3
- Issledovaniya problem mira v period i posle konflikta „Vostok-Zapad“. Stat’i poslednikh 20 let (Friedensforschung in und nach dem Ost-West-Konflikt. Aufsätze aus zwanzig Jahren) LIT/Progress, Münster/Moskau 1997, ISBN 3-8258-3042-X.
- Politische Streitfragen. VS-Verlag für Sozialwissenschaften, Wiesbaden 2008, ISBN 978-3-531-15833-4.
- (Editor) Nationalism in Late and Post-Communist Europe. 3 volumes. Nomos, Baden-Baden 2008/2009, ISBN 978-3-8329-3873-4, ISBN 978-3-8329-3921-2, ISBN 978-3-8329-3922-9. (Published also in German and Russian ).
- Frieden und Konflikt. VS-Verlag für Sozialwissenschaften, Wiesbaden 2012, ISBN 978-3-531-16490-8.
- Politische Streitfragen 2. Deutsche Innen- und Außenpolitik. VS-Verlag für Sozialwissenschaften, Wiesbaden 2012, ISBN 978-3-531-18617-7.
- Politische Streitfragen 3. Internationale Politik. VS-Verlag für Sozialwissenschaften, Wiesbaden 2012, ISBN 978-3-531-18618-4.

Jahn edited 30 Untersuchungen (inquiries) of FKKS (Frankfurt, then Mannheim) from 1992 to 2004. In addition he is editor of the series “Studien zu Konflikt und Kooperation im Osten” published by LIT, of which 19 volumes had appeared by 2011.
