= Citizens' Committee for Children =

Citizens' Committee for Children of New York
- Formation: 1944; 82 years ago
- Headquarters: New York, NY
- Executive Director: Jennifer March
- Revenue: ▲$2,727,178 (2014)
- Expenses: ▲$2,767,341 (2014)
- Website: www.cccnewyork.org

Citizens' Committee for Children of New York (CCC) is a nonprofit, 501(c)(3) non-governmental organization based in New York City and founded in 1944 that provides "a voice for children, especially poor and vulnerable children and children with special needs" as the city's "only locally-based, multi-issue child advocacy organization" working towards its aim of making the city a better place for children.

== History ==
Eleanor Roosevelt, Adele Rosenwald Levy and Marion Ascoli (daughters of Julius Rosenwald), Judge Justine W. Polier, Alfred J. Kahn, Dr. Kenneth Clark (of Kenneth and Mamie Clark), and Benjamin Spock were among CCC's founders and early leaders. Though Charlotte Carr, of Chicago's Hull House, was CCC's first Executive Director, Trude Lash longtime friend of Eleanor Roosevelt, was its first Program Director in 1946 and served as Executive Director for 20 years from 1952 until 1972.

In May 1954, the organization elected Dean Kenneth W. Johnson of the Columbia University School of Social Work to serve as its chairman, succeeding Leonard W. Mayo, who became a director of the committee.

A November 2008 article in The New York Times documented the effects of the economic downturn on charitable organizations. Executive director Jennifer March-Joly described how the organization was working to deal with the demise of Lehman Brothers, which had covered most of the cost of promoting Works on Paper, a fund-raising art auction the held each February.

== Programs and Proposals ==
The Citizen's Committee for Children has advocated on behalf of a number of proposed legislative changes that would benefit children and their families:

- Birthright Trust Fund (BTF) - an account would be created at birth for all children in New York City or New York State that would be started with a government contribution of approximately $500, with additional contributions made to this account for low-income families from relatives, charitable organizations and the children themselves. Beneficiaries would be able to start making withdrawals at age 18 to fund education or a new business or place a down payment on a home, to foster steps that lead to economic self-sufficiency.
- Child Care Tax Credit - In contrast to the existing non-refundable Child and Dependent Care Credit, a refundable New York City Child Care Tax Credit would be based on family income and would be returned as a refund if there were no other taxes to offset the amount, with a phase-out as income increased. With legislative changes, the proposal would provide cash to 48,000 families in New York City families and as many as 1.8 million nationwide.

== Reports ==
Under the auspices of the Citizens' Committee on Children, Alfred J. Kahn of the Columbia University School of Social Work prepared a report issued in 1953 on the Children's Court in New York, based on a three-year study he performed with the cooperation of Presiding Justice John Warren Hill. An editorial in The New York Times about the report cited the work as an unprecedented look behind the scenes of Children's Court, which is normally closed to the public and the press. Kahn was able to examine records, interview staff, and observe cases as they were being decided. While complimentary of some aspects of the court's operation, Kahn called the system "a dream still unrealized" that needed to focus more on rehabilitation than punishment.

Citizens' Committee for Children of New York released a 109-page report in 1957 titled For Children in Trouble written by Kahn that argued that the city's efforts for children "does not deal adequately with children in trouble". Kahn's recommendations included a new City Children's Bureau, or a strengthened existing one, that would oversee programs on a more systematic basis to address the issue that "inadequate measures are often taken because of community self-deception" that the institutions and resources available are capable of meeting a child's need. The report cited lengthy waiting lists and overcrowding at institutions intended to serve children and a 50-60% recidivism rate by age 21 for children released from State Training Schools.

== See also ==
- Association for the Wellbeing of Children in Healthcare
