= Žarko Knežević =

Montenegrin basketball player (1947–2020)

Personal information
- Born: 17 July 1947 Mojanovići, PR Montenegro, FPR Yugoslavia
- Died: 30 October 2020 (aged 73) Belgrade, Serbia
- Listed height: 2.10 m (6 ft 11 in)
- Listed weight: 107 kg (236 lb)

Career information
- NBA draft: 1969: undrafted
- Playing career: 1965–1983
- Position: Center

Career history
- 1968–1977: OKK Beograd
- 1977–1978: BBV Hagen
- 1978–1979: Fenerbahçe
- 1979–1980: OKK Beograd
- 1980–1982: Budućnost
- 1982–1983: OKK Beograd

Žarko Knežević (Serbian Cyrillic: Жарко Кнежевић; 17 July 1947 – 30 October 2020) was a Montenegrin basketball player who played at the center position.

Knežević was a member of the Yugoslav national team from 1971 to 1974. He played for Fenerbahçe at the 1978–79 season.
