= Sheila Kamerman =

Sheila Brody Kamerman, DSW is a social work educator and researcher at the Columbia University School of Social Work (CUSSW). She is the Compton Foundation Centennial Professor Emerita of Social Work for the Prevention of Children’s and Youth Problems. She is also Co-Director of the Institute for Child and Family Policy at Columbia University and Co-Director, Cross-National Studies Research Program. Kamerman is a Fellow at the American Academy of Social Work and Social Welfare. She has been a CUSSW professor since 1979.

== Education ==
Bachelor, New York University, 1946. Master of Social Work, Hunter College, 1966. Doctor in Social Welfare, Columbia University, 1973.

== Career ==
Her teaching focus includes social policy, child and family policy and international social welfare.

=== Select publications ===
- (Co-Edited with Alfred J. Kahn) Beyond Child Poverty: The Social Exclusion of Children (New York: Columbia University Institute for Child and Family Policy, 2003)
- (Co-Edited with Peter Moss) The Politics of Parental Leave Policies (Bristol, UK: Policy Press, 2009)
- (Co-Edited with Shelley Phipps and Asher Ben Arieh) From Child Welfare to Child Well-Being (Springer, 2009)
- Gatenio Gabel, Shirley & Kamerman, Sheila. (2013). Conditional Cash Transfers (CCTs): A Child Policy Strategy in Asia. doi:10.1007/978-94-007-7386-8_12
- Kamerman, Sheila B.; Kahn, Alfred J.; Kingston, Paul W. (1983). Maternity Policies and Working Women. Columbia University Press. ISBN 0-231-05750-4.

== Honors and awards ==
- The International Society for Child Indicators (ISCI)
