= Association for the Wellbeing of Children in Healthcare =

Association for the Wellbeing of Children in Healthcare (AWCH)
- Founded: 1973
- Type: Hospitalised children Charity
- Purpose: Children's Rights
- Location(s): AWCH National Office, Gladesville Hospital, Building 40B, Cnr Victoria & Punt Roads, Gladesville, New South Wales 2111
- Coordinates: 33°50′21″S 151°08′01″E
- Origins: United Kingdom's National Association for the Welfare of Children in Hospital
- Region served: Australia
- Services: Charitable services
- Method: Popular Education and Activism
- Website: awch.org.au
- Formerly called: Association for the Welfare of Children in Hospital * Association for the Welfare of Child Health

The Association for the Wellbeing of Children in Healthcare is an Australian-based voluntary organisation that gives non-medical attention and support to hospitalised children and their parents. Formed in 1973, the group changed its name from Association for the Welfare of Children in Hospital to Association for the Welfare of Child Health in 1993 and then to Association for the Wellbeing of Children in Healthcare in 2007. In 2008, the association co-wrote "Standards for the Care of Children and Adolescents in Health Services," a set of guidelines for treating children and teenagers in wards that are separate from adults. As of 2007, the association was based in Gladesville, New South Wales.

== History ==
In 1959, the United Kingdom's Ministry of Health published the Platt Report 1959, a three-year investigative account of the welfare of children in United Kingdom hospital that required hospitals to implement major changes in the non-medical care of children in hospital. That led to the 1961 formation of Mother Care for Children in Hospital (MCCH), a group formed to increase the roles mothers had over the care of their child in hospital. By 1965, enough like-minded healthcare professionals joined the mother's group and the group was renamed the National Association for the Welfare of Children in Hospital (NAWCH). That led to the formation of similar groups in Canada (Canadian Association for Community Care) and Australia.

The Association for the Wellbeing of Children in Healthcare (AWCH) was founded as Association for the Welfare of Children in Hospital (AWCH) on 15 February 1973 in Australia as a voluntary organisation that gives non-medical attention and support to hospitalised children and their parents. The newly formed organisation wanted to make the public aware of conditions for children in NSW's hospitals, including deficiencies in standards of care. The Association was particularly concerned whether parents were allowed to visit freely in hospitals. Years of debate over the need to consider the emotional as well as physical needs of children in hospital lay behind the formation of the new body. The group changed its 1973 name from Association for the Welfare of Children in Hospital to Association for the Welfare of Child Health in 1993, and then to Association for the Wellbeing of Children in Healthcare in 2007.

In 2008, the Association for the Wellbeing of Children in Healthcare and the Royal Australian College of Physicians co-wrote "Standards for the Care of Children and Adolescents in Health Services," a set of guidelines for treating children and teenagers in wards that are separate from adults. The standard concluded that treating children and teenagers on mixed wards alongside adults exposed the minors to poor care and mental trauma. To address this, the Association for the Wellbeing of Children in Healthcare proposed in the standard to treat children in separate areas of adult wards where staff are trained in children's needs or in wards that are completely separate from adults.

== Publications ==
- Association for the Wellbeing of Children in Healthcare; et al. (19 November 2008), "Standards for the Care of Children and Adolescents in Health Services", Paediatrics & Child Health Division, RACP, archived from the original on 9 April 2013

== See also ==
- Citizens' Committee for Children
