= Alfred Kahn =

Alfred or Al Kahn may refer to:

- Alfred E. Kahn (1917–2010), American professor, government official and regulatory economist
- Alfred J. Kahn (1919–2009), American child welfare specialist
- Alfred R. Kahn (born 1947), American executive, former CEO and chairman of 4Kids Entertainment

== See also ==
- Al Khan, suburb of Sharjah, United Arab Emirates
