= Trude Lash =

German-American political activist and children's advocate

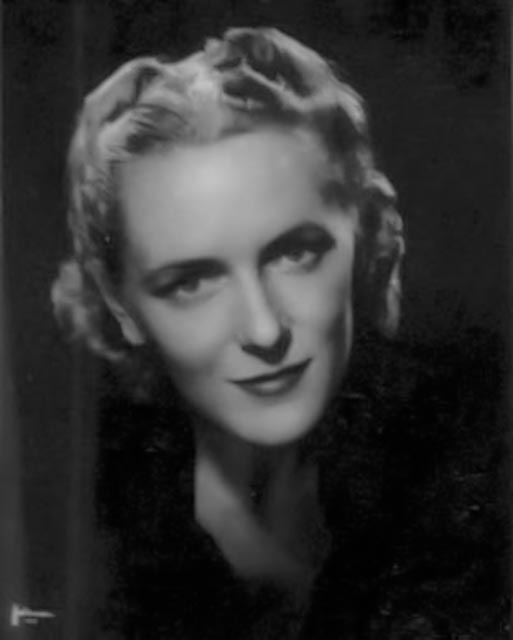

Trude Lash, formerly Gertrude Pratt, née Wenzel (13 June 1908 – 4 February 2004) was a political activist, advocate for children, and close associate of Eleanor Roosevelt.

She was born in June 1908 in Freiburg, Germany. She taught kindergarten while attending the University of Heidelberg and studying journalism. In 1930, she earned a PhD in Philosophy at the University of Freiburg. Thereafter, she emigrated to the United States and taught German literature and philosophy at Hunter College, and continued research at Columbia University.

She joined the International Student Service (ISS), and returned to her homeland. In Germany, she worked for a newspaper at the time of the National Socialist accession to power, and was openly critical of the new régime. Together with her first husband, Eliot Pratt, she moved to the United States permanently, and assisted other refugees seeking to leave Germany.

Trude followed Joseph P. Lash as general-secretary of the ISS. Lash had been investigated by the House Un-American Activities Committee, and became good friends with First Lady Eleanor Roosevelt. Lash worked closely with Molly Yard. Lash and Yard were prominent members of the Popular Front.

A Venona decryption from May 1943 discloses contact with Trude was maintained by Aleksej Sokirkin, First Secretary of the Soviet Embassy in Washington, D.C. for Soviet intelligence. The decrypt proposes using Trude to process information on Eleanor Roosevelt (Kapitansha). It also suggests bringing Elizabeth Zarubina, who handled many high-level important cases, into close touch with her.

In 1944, Trude and Lash were married. Trude served with the former First Lady on the newly created Human Rights Committee of the United Nations. Subsequently, Lash served as Executive Director of the Citizens' Committee for Children of New York and the Foundation for Child Development.

In 1984, Lash helped to combine the separate Eleanor Roosevelt and Franklin Roosevelt institutions into a single entity: the Roosevelt Institute.
