= Bernhard Ebbinghaus =

German sociologist

- Born: June 2, 1961 (age 65); Stuttgart, Germany
- Education: University of Mannheim, European University Institute, University of Cologne
- Known for: welfare state, labour markets
- Scientific career
- Fields: Macrosociology
- Workplaces: University of Mannheim, University of Oxford, University of Vienna
- Thesis: Labour unity in union diversity : trade unions and social cleavages in Western Europe, 1890-1989 (1993)
- Doctoral advisor: Gøsta Esping-Andersen
- Website: ebbinghaus.blog

Bernhard Ebbinghaus (born 2 June 1961) is a German sociologist, known for his research on comparative social policy and welfare state systems in Europe. He is Professor of Sociology at the University of Mannheim, where he holds the Chair of Macrosociology.

Previously he was Professor of Social Policy at the Department of Social Policy and Intervention at the University of Oxford.

== Early life and education ==
Ebbinghaus was born in 1961 in Stuttgart. He studied sociology at the University of Mannheim (1981–88) and was a Fulbright student at the New School for Social Research in 1984/85. Following a year at the Institut Universitaire d'Etudes Européennes in Geneva, he was a doctoral student at the European University Institute (EUI) in Florence, Italy (1989–92).

At the EUI in Florence he wrote his Ph.D. thesis on Labour Unity in Union Diversity: Trade Unions and Social Cleavages in Western Europe, 1890-1989 (1993). His doctoral dissertation was supervised by Gøsta Esping-Andersen.

== Academic career and work ==
After completing his Ph.D., Ebbinghaus returned to the University of Mannheim as a researcher and lecturer (Wissenschaftlicher Assistent) from 1992 to 1996. Ebbinghaus taught sociology and coordinated an international research project on trade unions in Europe at the Mannheim Centre for European Social Research (MZES).

From 1997 until 2004, he was Senior Fellow at the Max Planck Institute for the Study of Societies (MPIfG) in Cologne and completed his Habilitation thesis in sociology at the University of Cologne in 2003.

He was John F. Kennedy Memorial Fellow at the Center for European Studies at Harvard University (1999/2000), visiting professor at the University of Wisconsin in Madison (fall 2001), and Interim Professor at the University of Jena, Germany (2003–04). Ebbinghaus was Professor of Sociology (Chair of Macrosociology) at the University of Mannheim from 2004 until 2016, where he was founding director of the Doctoral Center for the Social and Behavioral Studies of the Graduate School of Economic and Social Sciences (GESS) (2006–09). He also served as a board member of the Collaborative Research Centre SFB 884 "Political Economy of Reforms" and co-led a long-term project on "welfare state reforms from below" within that research initiative.

From 2008 to 2011, he was Director of the Mannheim Centre for European Social Research (MZES), one of the largest university-based social science research institutes in Germany.

In 2017 Ebbinghaus moved to the United Kingdom to join the University of Oxford. He became Professor of Social Policy, Head of the Department of Social Policy and Intervention and Fellow of Green Templeton College at the University of Oxford. At Oxford, he continued his comparative research on welfare policies and also co-directed international research projects.

Ebbingaus returned to the Chair of Macrosociology at University of Mannheim in 2022. In 2023, he was invited as the Karl Polanyi Visiting Professor at the University of Vienna, where he delivered lectures on welfare state resilience during economic crises.

Since November 2021 Professor Ebbinghaus is member of the European Commission's High-Level Group on the future of social protection and of the welfare state in the EU.

According to Google Scholar, his research has been cited more than 10,000 times. His most cited publication is Trade Unions in Western Europe since 1945, co-authored with Jelle Visser in the year 2000.

Ebbinghaus's research centers on the comparative analysis of welfare state regimes, labor markets, and social policies in advanced economies He is a specialist of comparative social policy, analyzing the reform processes of welfare states in Europe and other OECD countries. He has examined how developed welfare states cope with challenges such as globalization, demographic ageing, and economic crises, analyzing both policy reform processes and their social outcomes. A significant theme in his work is the role of key institutions—like pension systems, trade unions, and employer associations—in shaping social policy changes over time. His early research, for example, focused on labor organization and resulted in a comprehensive reference on postwar union development. He has also contributed to understanding "welfare capitalism" across different countries; the edited volume Comparing Welfare Capitalism (2001) contrasted social policy and political economy in Europe, the United States, and Japan.

One of Ebbinghaus's notable areas of expertise is pension policy and retirement. His 2006 book Reforming Early Retirement in Europe, Japan and the USA examined the trend of early exit from the labor force and efforts to reform pension systems comparatively. He later edited The Varieties of Pension Governance (2011), which analyzed pension privatization and governance in various European countries.

== Book publications ==
- with J. Timo Weishaupt, eds.The Role of Social Partners in Managing Europe’s Great Recession: Crisis Corporatism or Corporatism in Crisis?. Abingdon, UK: Routledge, 2021
- with Elias Naumann, eds.Welfare State Reforms Seen from Below. Comparing Public Attitudes and Organized Interests in Britain and Germany, London, UK: Palgrave Macmillan / Cham, Switzerland: Springer Online, 2018.
- ed. The Varieties of Pension Governance. Pension Privatization in Europe. Oxford, UK: Oxford University Press, 2011.
- Reforming Early Retirement in Europe, Japan and the USA. Oxford, UK: Oxford University Press, 2006.
- with Philip Manow, eds., Comparing Welfare Capitalism: Social Policy and Political Economy in Europe, Japan and the USA. London, UK: Routledge, 2001.
- with Jelle Visser: Trade Unions in Western Europe since 1945. London, UK: Palgrave-Macmillan, 2000.
