= Mojanovići =

Mojanovići Мојановићи
- Village
- Location within Montenegro
- Country: Montenegro
- Municipality: Zeta

Population (2011)
  - Total: 2,593
- Time zone: UTC+1 (CET)
  - Summer (DST): UTC+2 (CEST)

Mojanovići (Montenegrin and Serbian: Мојановићи, pronounced [mɔjǎːnɔv̞it͡ɕi]) is a village in the new Zeta Municipality of Montenegro. Until 2022, it was part of Podgorica Municipality.

== Demographics ==
According to the 2003 census, the village has a population of 1,850 people.

According to the 2011 census, its population was 2,593.

Ethnicity in 2011
| Ethnicity | Number | Percentage |
|---|---|---|
| Montenegrins | 1,722 | 66.4% |
| Serbs | 626 | 24.1% |
| Roma | 7 | 0.3% |
| Albanians | 6 | 0.2% |
| other/undeclared | 232 | 8.9% |
| Total | 2,593 | 100% |

== Notable people ==
- Žarko Knežević, retired basketball player.
- Dejan Zlatičanin, professional boxer.
