= International Society for Quality of Life Studies =

The International Society for Quality of Life Studies (ISQOLS) is an international, academic organization which promotes research in and measurement of "quality of life."

== Objectives ==
The organization's stated general objectives are to provide a worldwide interdisciplinary collaboration framework between academics and professionals in the field of Quality of Life Studies with the intention of generating policy and society changes based on scientific research.

== Conferences and publications ==
The society sponsors international conferences. The ninth annual ISQOLS conference was held in Florence, Italy on the theme "Measures and Goals of the Progress of Societies"; in attendance were 373 participants from 44 countries. OECD chief statistician Enrico Giovannini, in his keynote address to the conference, referenced the Istanbul Declaration of 2007, an agreement by number of international organizations (the European Commission, OECD, the Organization of the Islamic Conference, the United Nations, the UNDP and the World Bank) to develop a new paradigm for statistical evaluation and policy-making which would go beyond gross domestic product and also include subjective indicators of well-being.

The society publishes the journal Applied Research in Quality of Life.

== See also ==
- Social Weather Stations
- Gross National Happiness
