= Jens Alber =

German sociologist and political scientist (born 1947)

- Born: 1947 (age 78–79)
- Awards: Stein Rokkan Prize for Comparative Social Science Research

Academic work
- Discipline: Political scientist
- Main interests: European Union politics

Jens Alber (born 1947) is a German sociologist and political scientist. He was awarded the 1983 Stein Rokkan Prize for Comparative Social Science Research.

== Career ==
In 1972, Jens Alber graduated from University of Konstanz in sociology, political science and psychology. From 1972 to 1973 he was a certified research assistant at the department of sociology at University of Mannheim.

Between 1973 and 1977 he served as assistant at the Research Institute of Sociology at University of Cologne, and from 1977 to 1980 served as assistant at the Research Institute for Sociology of the University of Cologne.

From 1980 to 1983, he worked as research fellow at the European University Institute in Florence in the project "The Development of the Western European Welfare States Since the Second World War".

From 1986 to 1991, Jens Alber worked as a research assistant at the Max Planck Institute for the Study of Societies in Cologne. In 1991 he took over the chair of social policy at the faculty of administrative sciences of the University of Konstanz, which he held until 2001.

From 2002 to 2011 Jens Alber was director of the department "Inequality and Social Integration" at the Social Science Research Center Berlin and professor of sociology at the Free University of Berlin.
