= Alfred J. Kahn =

American social policy expert

Alfred Joseph Kahn (February 8, 1919 – February 13, 2009) was an American expert on social policy, particularly as it related to child welfare. He was critical of problems at the local and federal governmental level in providing services related to child development and family support, arguing that a comprehensive system of social welfare provision should be made available to all Americans comparable to similar systems offered in Western Europe.

== Birth and education ==
Born in Williamsburg, Brooklyn to a Jewish family, Kahn was raised in Bensonhurst, Brooklyn. After moving with his family to the Bronx, he attended DeWitt Clinton High School. He attended the City College of New York, graduating in 1939, and then attended the Seminary College of Jewish Studies at the Jewish Theological Seminary where he earned a degree in Hebrew letters.

== Service in the USAF ==
Serving in the United States Army Air Forces (now the USAF) during World War II, Kahn served at Drew Field near Tampa, Florida, where he participated in that branch's first mental-hygiene unit, studying the connections between childhood experiences of soldiers and their propensity to experience battlefield stress or go AWOL.

== After military service ==
After leaving military service, his experiences in the Air Force led him to pursue a master's degree in social work and Kahn was hired by Columbia University School of Social Work as an instructor in 1947. In 1952, he was awarded the school's first doctorate granted in the field of social welfare, writing a dissertation on New York's Children's Court; He was appointed as Associate Professor of Social Work and Social Research at the school.

Kahn's report on the Children's Court in New York, was based on a three-year study he performed under the auspices of the Citizens' Committee on Children and with the cooperation of Presiding Justice John Warren Hill. An editorial in The New York Times about the report cited the work as an unprecedented look behind the scenes of Children's Court, which is normally closed to the public and the press. Kahn was able to examine records, interview staff and to observe cases as they were being decided. While complimentary of some aspects of the court's operation, Kahn called the system "a dream still unrealized" that needed to focus more on rehabilitation than punishment.

He began with work on childhood development and delinquency, later branching out to include research on the underlying causes of poverty. He argued that social services provide by local, state and federal governments should be treated as a "social utility", similar to fire departments and post offices, rather than being derogated as "welfare" and that these services should be offered to all, not just the poor. Starting in the 1970s, he developed numerous studies comparing how social welfare services are provided in the U.S. and Europe. During his 57 years teaching at the Columbia University School of Social Work, he provided oversight of social services provided New York, writing numerous reports for the Citizens' Committee for Children on subjects such as child-guidance programs, juvenile courts and truancy. In a 1965 interview with the New York Post he stated that "I represent a concern for what is being accomplished, rather than what is being done", noting that "'Services rendered' are not enough. I want to know what's going on."

A 109-page report titled "For Children in Trouble" written by Kahn and released in 1957 by the Citizens' Committee for Children argued that the city's efforts for children "does not deal adequately with children in trouble". Kahn's recommendations included a new City Children's Bureau, or a strengthened existing one, that would oversee programs on a more systematic basis to address the issue that "inadequate measures are often taken because of community self-deception" that the institutions and resources available are capable of meeting a child's need. The report cited lengthy waiting lists and overcrowding at institutions intended to serve children and a 50-60% recidivism rate by age 21 for children released from State Training Schools.

A 1960 report prepared by Kahn for the Citizens' Committee for Children showed that most juvenile delinquents sent to state facilities come out with their antisocial tendencies reinforced and these training schools focus too much stress on punishment than rehabilitation. In the face of public pressure to do something about the growing delinquency problem, judges were deemed to ready to send youths to institutions despite knowing that these facilities have "so many negative features as to render [them] little more than a place to hold a child in custody". Kahn recommended follow-up care following release among a list of other recommendations that included segregating children under 12 from older children, special facilities for disturbed delinquents and halfway houses for those released from facilities.

He served as chairman of the Committee on Child Development Research and Public Policy of the United States National Academy of Sciences in the early 1980s. He was the author of some 25 books and hundreds of articles on a variety of social issues.

== Honors and awards ==
- The International Society for Child Indicators (ISCI)
- 1998 inducted into Columbia University School of Social Work Hall of Fame

== Death ==
A resident of Cliffside Park, New Jersey, Kahn died on February 13, 2009, in Hackensack, New Jersey, five days after his 90th birthday. He was survived by a daughter, a brother and a sister.
