= Mannheim Centre for European Social Research =

Research institute in the University of Mannheim

Coordinates: 49.48737°N 8.45662°E

Mannheim Centre for European Social Research (MZES)
- Abbreviation: MZES
- Formation: 1989
- Purpose: Research
- Location: Mannheim, Baden-Wuerttemberg, Germany
- Director: Philipp Heldmann; Sabine Carey
- Affiliations: University of Mannheim
- Staff: 80
- Volunteers: 60 (Research Assistants)
- Website: mzes.uni-mannheim.de

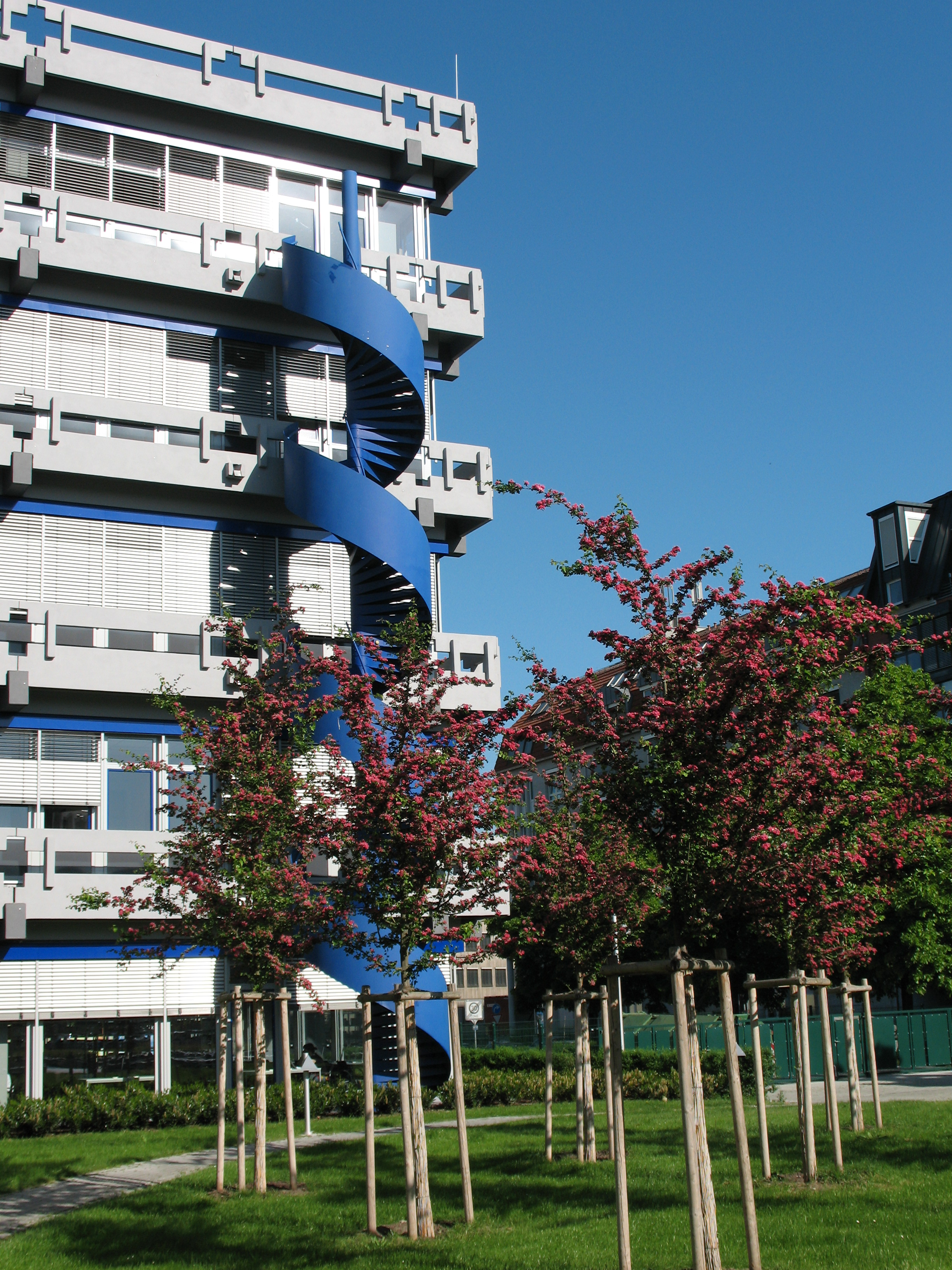
Main building of the MZES in the square A 5

The Mannheim Centre for European Social Research (MZES) is an interdisciplinary research institute of the University of Mannheim, founded in 1989. It is located in the square A5 of the city of Mannheim nearby the Mannheim Palace.

The institute devotes itself to research on societal and political developments in Europe. Research focus is located in comparative research on Europe and the investigation of the European integration. The MZES mainly carries out basic research, financed by external funds from the German national research foundation (Deutsche Forschungsgemeinschaft), foundations promoting scientific research, and research funds from the European Union. Furthermore, the MZES, closely related to the School of Social Sciences of the University of Mannheim, gives training and support to young social scientists, when starting their scientific careers. At present, approximately 80 social scientists and 60 students are working at the MZES. Thus, the MZES is the largest institute of the University of Mannheim, and the largest research institute of a German university in the field of the social sciences.

From 1989–1998 the institute was composed of four work units:

- I Social structure and the Welfare State
- II Elections and Policy Research
- III Political and Social Integration
- IV German Democratic Republic / East Europe (1992 to 1998)

In 1999, these four work units were reduced to two research departments:

- Research Department A, The European Societies and their Integration: since February 2026 directed by the sociologist Bernhard Ebbinghaus.
- Research Department B, The European Political Systems and their Integration: since February 2022 directed by the political scientist Thomas Bräuninger.

The director and the heads of the research departments together form the executive board of the institute. The activity of the executive board and the institute is controlled by a supervisory board. The institute's research program is outlined for three years and evaluated by an international scientific advisory board. An annual report informs about the institute's activity.

== Directors ==
The director is elected by the supervisory board for a period of three years.

- Peter Flora 1989–1992 founding director, sociology
- Franz Urban Pappi 1993–1995, political science
- Peter Flora 1996–1998, sociology
- Jan W. van Deth 1999–2001, political science
- Walter Müller 2002–2004, sociology
- Wolfgang C. Müller 2005–2007, political science
- Bernhard Ebbinghaus 2008–2011, sociology
- Rüdiger Schmitt-Beck 2011-2014, political science
- Frank Kalter 2014-2017, sociology
- Marc Debus 2017-2020, political science
- Irena Kogan 2020-2023, sociology
- Sabine Carey 2023-2026, political science
- Marc Helbling 2026–, sociology

A managing director supports the director in his/her work. This position was held from 1989–1997 by Andreas Weber, and from 1998–2009 by Reinhart Schneider. Since 2010 Philipp Heldmann is managing director of the institute.
