= Michael T. Embrich =

American government official

Michael Embrich
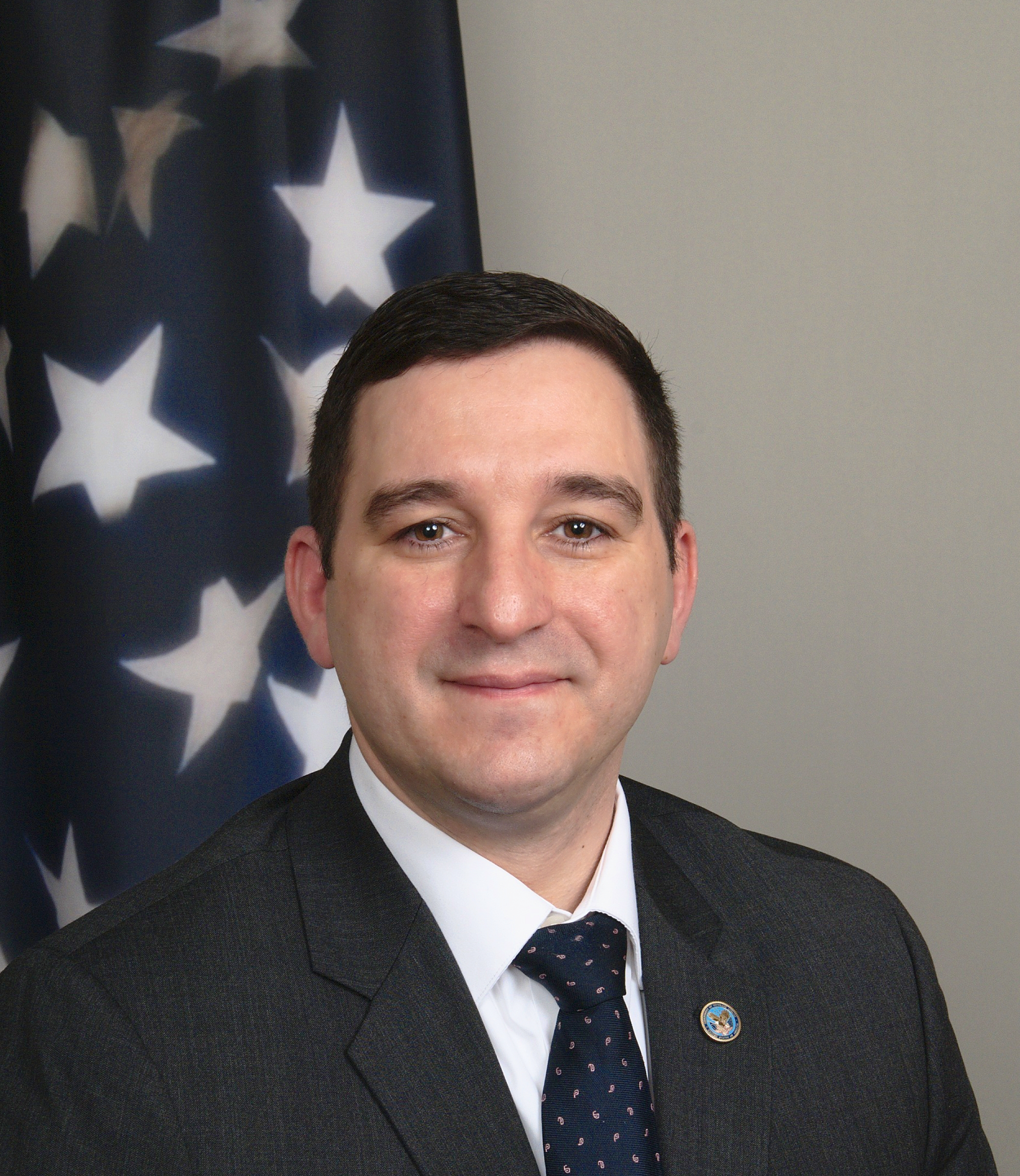
- Embrich in 2026

First Acting Veteran Advocate of New Jersey
- Incumbent
- Assumed office August 2026
- Governor: Mikie Sherrill
- Preceded by: Office established

Member of the Advisory Committee on the Readjustment of Veterans
- In office 2021–2023
- Appointed by: Secretary of Veterans Affairs Denis McDonough
- President: Joe Biden

Personal details
- Born: Michael Thomas Embrich Hoboken, New Jersey, U.S.
- Party: Democratic
- Education: Rutgers University (BA, MA)
- Occupation: Government official, veterans advocate, writer
- Awards: Global War on Terrorism Expeditionary Medal Navy "E" Ribbon Armed Forces Civilian Service Medal

Military service
- Branch/service: United States Navy
- Years of service: 2000–2004
- Battles/wars: Operation Enduring Freedom Operation Iraqi Freedom

Michael Thomas Embrich is an American government official, veterans advocate, writer, and United States Navy veteran. In August 2026, New Jersey Governor Mikie Sherrill nominated Embrich to serve as the first Veteran Advocate of the State of New Jersey, leading the newly established Office of the Veteran Advocate. The position is responsible for independently reviewing veterans' services and facilities in the state and advocating on behalf of veterans and their families.

Embrich previously served in federal, state, and local government positions, including as a policy adviser on veterans affairs, a congressional staffer, a communications official with the United States Army, and in senior staff positions in the New Jersey Legislature. He also served on federal advisory bodies associated with the United States Department of Veterans Affairs and the United States Department of the Treasury.

A veteran of Operation Enduring Freedom and Operation Iraqi Freedom, Embrich served aboard the aircraft carrier USS Theodore Roosevelt (CVN-71). He later became active in veterans policy and advocacy.

Embrich is also a writer and commentator on veterans affairs, military policy and government. He has contributed to Rolling Stone, Government Executive, Military Times, Federal Times, and Defense One, among other publications. He is the author of the 2021 book March On: A Veterans Travel Guide.

== Early life and education ==
Embrich was raised in Bayonne, New Jersey, and enlisted in the United States Navy shortly after graduating from Bayonne High School. Embrich later attended New York University and Rutgers University where he graduated with a Bachelor's and master's degree in political science. Embrich is a member of Pi Sigma Alpha, the National Political Science Honor Society.

== Government and public service career ==
=== Congressional and New Jersey government service ===
After military service, Embrich worked in government and politics at the federal, state and local levels. He served as a congressional staffer and later held senior staff positions in the New Jersey General Assembly, including work as a chief of staff. In 2025 Embrich was named to InsiderNJ's Power 100 list.

His policy work included veterans affairs and constituent services. Embrich also became involved in advocacy surrounding expansion of education benefits for post-9/11 veterans, including the legislation that became the Post-9/11 Veterans Educational Assistance Act of 2008.

=== Treasury and taxpayer advocacy ===
During the 2010s, Embrich served in a taxpayer-advocacy capacity associated with the United States Department of the Treasury and Internal Revenue Service. He served as a New Jersey alternate representative connected with the Taxpayer Advocacy Panel, a federal advisory committee made up of citizen volunteers that provides recommendations to the IRS and National Taxpayer Advocate concerning taxpayer service.

The panel represents taxpayers geographically and makes recommendations concerning IRS programs, products and services.

== New Jersey Veteran Advocate ==
On August 5, 2026, Governor Mikie Sherrill announced Embrich's nomination to become New Jersey's first Veteran Advocate.

The Office of the Veteran Advocate was established by legislation signed into law in December 2025. The office was designed to operate independently while being administratively located within New Jersey's veterans-affairs structure.

Under state law, the Veteran Advocate serves as the administrator and chief executive officer of the office and is appointed by the governor with the advice and consent of the New Jersey Senate. The law requires the officeholder to be a veteran and establishes a five-year term.

The office is responsible for investigating complaints involving veterans' services and care, inspecting veterans facilities, reviewing allegations of abuse or neglect, monitoring corrective actions, assisting veterans in obtaining benefits and services, and representing veterans' interests before state and federal agencies.

Sherrill described Embrich's position as an independent voice for New Jersey veterans and their families. His nomination made him the first person selected to lead the office since its creation.

== Selected works ==
March On: A Veterans Travel Guide (2021)

=== Selected journalism ===
Embrich has written extensively on veterans and military policy for Rolling Stone, including articles addressing Department of Veterans Affairs staffing, veterans' disability benefits, federal employment protections for veterans, Project 2025, and federal policies affecting military personnel.

He has also published commentary on veterans homelessness, VA health care, federal workforce policy and military affairs in Government Executive, Defense One, Military Times and Federal Times. In 2026 Embrich was awarded for his coverage of veterans benefits by Military Veterans in Journalism and Military Reporters and Editors.
