= Periodical Press Galleries of the United States Congress =

The Periodical Press Galleries (PPG), along with the Daily Press Galleries, Radio and Television Galleries, and Senate Press Photographers’ Gallery, comprise the four media galleries of the United States Congress. The United States Congress is the only legislature to divide its media into distinct press galleries. Collectively known as the Periodical Press Galleries, the PPG maintain two separate offices in the House and Senate wings of the Capitol in order to “assist Members of Congress, Congressional staff, and bona fide correspondents covering Congress, with media logistics and press-related concerns.”

The House Periodical Press Gallery operates under Rule VI of the Rules of the House of Representatives, and the Senate Periodical Press Gallery under Rule XXXIII of the Standing Rules of the United States Senate. Under these rules, the Speaker of the House and the Senate Committee on Rules and Administration maintain final authority over all the press galleries.

== Press accreditation ==
The main purpose of the Periodical Press Galleries is to credential correspondents from magazines, newsletters, non-daily newspapers and online publications. In turn, this provides correspondents media access to:

- Gallery space inside the House and Senate chambers
- Gallery workspace
- the State of the Union address
- the Presidential Inauguration
- Joint sessions of Congress
- Gold Medal ceremonies
- State Funerals
- all other special Congressional Events
  In addition, the Periodical Press Galleries assist with credentialing for the Democratic and Republican National Conventions.

== Creation of the media galleries ==
Prior to the creation of the congressional media galleries, the House and Senate handled the issuance of press credentials. Each house passed regulations independently of one another to limit lobbyists and claim agents of the Revolutionary and Civil War pensioners from obtaining press credentials. The House first adopted a resolution in 1838 that required correspondents to have written permission from the Speaker of the House, and that they identify their employer. The Senate adopted a similar stance in 1841, permitting only bona fide correspondents access to a special press gallery. Further regulations were passed as attempts to curtail lobbying and the corruption of journalism, but scandals persisted. The House and Senate eventually conceded to reporters’ demands for self-regulation by allowing for the first of the congressional media galleries to be created, the Daily Press Gallery. This press gallery was to be supervised by a body of reporters called the Standing Committee of Correspondents, who first published Rules for Membership in 1879.

=== The Periodical Press Galleries ===
The increasing appearance of trade journals and business magazines following World War I, along with the widespread prevalence of radio as a news medium, demonstrated the need for additional media galleries. In 1933, radio correspondents from an independent news service of CBS applied for admission to the Daily Press Galleries. Since it did not represent daily newspapers or have any association with daily telegraphic services, the Standing Committee of Correspondents denied the application. Under the same reasoning, the Standing Committee also denied correspondents from Oil News Bureau and Time in 1937. In 1939, Fulton Lewis Jr. of Mutual Broadcasting System also applied to the Daily Press Gallery and was subsequently denied. He conferred with the Senate and House Rules Committees and was successful in receiving approval for a Radio Gallery in that same year. This helped lead the way for final approval of a Periodical Press Gallery in 1941.

== The Executive Committee of Periodical Correspondents ==
Since its inception, the Periodical Press Galleries have been supervised by the Executive Committee of Periodical Correspondents, a body of seven Periodical Press Gallery members elected every session of Congress. The Executive Committee is tasked with reviewing press credential applications. Publications must meet the criteria specified in the Rules of the Periodical Press Galleries and receive a majority vote of the Executive Committee members in order to be formally admitted to the Gallery. The Executive Committee also addresses any concerns of its membership, including press access, workspace, and Gallery employees.

=== List of the Executive Committee of Periodical Correspondents Chairmen ===
Chairman	Year(s)	Publication
Henry Ralph	1941–1944	Oil & Gas Journal
Gilbert Stewart	1945–1946	Newsweek
Frank McNaughton	1947–1952	Time
George Cullen	1953–1962	Bureau of National Affairs
W.B. Ragsdale	1963–1964	United States News
Neil MacNeil	1965–1966	Time
W.B. Ragsdale	1967–1968	United States News (U.S. News & World Report)
Earl Abrams	1969–1970	Telecasting Publications
Donald Smith	1971	U.S. News & World Report
David Secrest	1971–1972	McGraw-Hill
Robert Horowitz	1973–1974	Army Times
Samuel Shaffer	1975–1976	Newsweek
Dale Taft	1977–1978	Kiplinger Washington Editors
Gerald Parshall	1979–1980	U.S. News & World Report
Henry Hubbard	1981–1982	Newsweek
Donald Bacon	1983–1984	U.S. News & World Report
Rebecca Pearl	1985–1986	Bureau of National Affairs
Martha Craver	1987–1988	Army Times
Richard Cohen	1988–1989	National Journal
Doug Harbrecht	1990–1991	McGraw Hill
Hays Gorey	1991–1992	Time/Warner
Alexis Simendinger	1993–1994	Bureau of National Affairs
Rick Dunham	1995–1996	McGraw Hill
Craig Winneker	1997–1998	Capital Style (Roll Call)
Richard Maze	1999–2000	Army Times
Cheryl Bolen	2001–2002	Bureau of National Affairs
Lorraine Woellert	2003–2006	Business Week
Heidi Glenn	2007	Tax Notes
Richard Cohen	2007–2011	National Journal, Politico
Heather Rothman	2011–2016	Bureau of National Affairs
Leo Shane III	2016–2022	Sightline Media Group
Katherine Tully-McManus	2023	Politico

==== House and Senate Periodical Press Gallery spaces ====
When the Gallery was established in 1941, periodical correspondents were assigned six seats in the House Gallery, designated by Speaker of the House Sam Rayburn. From 1941 to 1946, periodical correspondents relied on only these seats to observe and report on the House floor debates. In 1946, physical office space was obtained in the House wing of the Capitol Building, where correspondents were given access to a telephone booth and room to set up typewriters and hang hats. One year later, the Executive Committee of Periodical Correspondents was successful in securing seats in the Senate Gallery. Room S-320 in the Senate wing of the Capitol Building was also obtained for a Senate Periodical Press Gallery office, where it has remained since. The House Periodical Press Gallery office space was later reassigned in 1971 to H-304 of the Capitol Building, its current location.

===== Gallery employees =====
Each Gallery office is managed by a Gallery director, formerly known as a superintendent, who is appointed by the Executive Committee of Periodical Correspondents and approved by the Speaker of the House or Senate Sergeant at Arms. Gallery employees are non-partisan and bound by the rules of their respective houses regarding ethics and employment.

===== House and Senate Periodical Press Gallery directors =====
House Gallery Director	Year(s)	Senate Gallery Director	Year(s)
William Perry	1946	William Perry	1946–1973
Paul Ridgely	1946–1953	Roy McGhee	1973–1991
Delmar Malkie	1953–1954	James Talbert	1991–2000
Don Womack	1954–1956	Edward Pesce	2000–2015
Clarence T. Day	1956–1972	Justin Wilson	2016–present
Jeanne Hundley Ordway	1972–1974		
David Holmes	1974–2002		
Robert Zatkowski	2002–present		

== Gallery membership ==
In the 77th session of Congress, Gallery membership included 18 publications and 42 credentialed correspondents. Membership has grown from magazines and non-daily newspapers to include new forms of print and online media. Newsletters were first approved in 1974, email-based publications in 1993, fax publications in 1994, CD-ROM publications in 1995, and online publications in 1996. The number of credentialed correspondents has grown over the years. In the 112th session of Congress, there were over 1,200 credentialed periodical correspondents representing 162 different publications. A large proportion of credentialed publications still represent the types of trade publications that were instrumental in founding the Periodical Press Galleries.

== History of the rules of the Periodical Press Galleries ==
The Rules of the Periodical Press Galleries were created in the same year as its inception, using some of the earlier regulations passed by Congress as a model for membership rules. The Executive Committee designed the Rules to protect the interests of Congress and the integrity of the press corps, as well as prevent groups with lobbying ties from using press credentials to influence legislation.

The Rules have undergone only slight revisions since they were first created. Extending membership to newsletters, Rule II was amended by the Executive Committee in 1972 and approved in 1973 by the Speaker of the House and the Senate Rules Committee, to include “or by subscription.” Rule II was again amended in 1979 in order to extend membership to publications published by non-profit organizations as long as they met all of the criteria put forth in Rule II. Since 1979, the Executive Committee has periodically formed subcommittees to reexamine the Rules and their application. Each time, these subcommittees concluded that the Rules remained relevant and made no recommendations for their revision.

=== Rules of the Periodical Press Galleries ===
Rule I

Persons eligible for admission to the Periodical Press Galleries must be bona fide resident correspondents of reputable standing, giving their chief attention to the gathering and reporting of news. They shall state in writing the names of their employers and their additional sources of earned income; and they shall declare that, while a member of the Galleries, they will not act as an agent in the prosecution of claims, and will not become engaged or assist, directly or indirectly, in any lobbying, promotion, advertising, or publicity activity intended to influence legislation or any other action of the Congress, nor any matter before any independent agency, or any department or other instrumentality of the Executive branch; and that they will not act as an agent for, or be employed by the Federal, or any State, local or foreign government or representatives thereof; and that they will not, directly or indirectly, furnish special or "insider" information intended to influence prices or for the purpose of trading on any commodity or stock exchange; and that they will not become employed, directly or indirectly, by any stock exchange, board of trade or other organization or member thereof, or brokerage house or broker engaged in the buying and selling of any security or commodity. Applications shall be submitted to the Executive Committee of the Periodical Correspondents' Association and shall be authenticated in a manner satisfactory to the Executive Committee.

Rule II

Applicants must be employed by periodicals that regularly publish a substantial volume of news material of either general, economic, industrial, technical, cultural, or trade character. The periodical must require such Washington coverage on a continuing basis and must be owned and operated independently of any government, industry, institution, association, or lobbying organization. Applicants must also be employed by a periodical that is published for profit and is supported chiefly by advertising or by subscription, or by a periodical meeting the conditions in this paragraph but published by a nonprofit organization that, first, operates independently of any government, industry, or institution and, second, does not engage, directly or indirectly, in any lobbying or other activity intended to influence any matter before Congress or before any independent agency or any department or other instrumentality of the Executive branch. House organs are not eligible.

Rule III

Members of the families of correspondents are not entitled to the privileges of the galleries.

Rule IV

The Executive Committee may issue temporary credentials permitting the privileges of the galleries to individuals who meet the rules of eligibility but who may be on short-term assignment or temporarily residing in Washington.

Rule V

Under the authority of rule 6 of the House of Representatives and of rule 33 of the Senate, the Periodical Galleries shall be under the control of the Executive Committee, subject to the approval and supervision of the Speaker of the House of Representatives and the Senate Committee on Rules and Administration. It shall be the duty of the Executive Committee, at its discretion, to report violations of the privileges of the galleries to the Speaker or the Senate Committee on Rules and Administration, and pending action thereon, the offending correspondent may be suspended. The committee shall be elected at the start of each Congress by members of the Periodical Correspondents' Association and shall consist of seven members with no more than one member from any one publishing organization. The committee shall elect its own officers and a majority of the committee may fill vacancies on the committee. The list in the Congressional Directory shall be a list only of members of the Periodical Correspondents' Association.

== Contested decisions of the executive committee ==
=== Consumers Union ===
In 1973, Consumers Union, publisher of Consumer Reports, applied for membership to the Periodical Press Galleries. The Executive Committee denied the publication membership on the grounds that the publication was not “owned and operated independently of any government, industry, institution, association, or lobbying organization” (Rule II). Consumers Union subsequently appealed to the Senate Committee on Rules and Administration and the Speaker of the House. The Senate Committee on Rules affirmed the Executive Committee’s decision, and the Speaker of the House took no action.

Consumers Union then sued the Executive Committee in the U.S. District Court for the District of Columbia, claiming that the denial of its membership application violated its First Amendment and Fifth Amendment rights. The District Court held in favor of Consumers Union. That decision was later reversed by the U.S. Court of Appeals for the District of Columbia Circuit, who held that credentialing members of the Periodical Gallery was a function protected by the Speech or Debate Clause, because it falls within the “legitimate legislative sphere.” The Court reasoned that the Executive Committee was acting pursuant to the Rules of the House of Representatives and the Standing Rules of the Senate which are promulgated pursuant to the Rulemaking Clause of the Constitution, and thus that the Executive Committee acted pursuant to authority “which the Constitution places with the jurisdiction of either House.” Also, the court reasoned that the actions of the Executive Committee were an “integral part of the legislative machinery,” and therefore an “integral part of the deliberation process.” Accordingly, the suit was dismissed because the Speech or Debate Clause rendered the Executive Committee immune from suit.

=== Executive Intelligence Review ===
In 1986, the Executive Committee denied the publication Executive Intelligence Review admission to the Periodical Press Galleries under the Rule II criteria. The Speaker of the House and the Chairman of the Senate Committee on Rules and Administration did not respond to requests to overturn the Executive Committee’s decision. The correspondent for Executive Intelligence Review then filed suit and asked the U.S. District Court for the District of Columbia to declare Rule II unconstitutional. The Court dismissed the case on the basis of Consumers Union, the Speech or Debate Clause, and separation-of-powers concerns. The Court found that the Rules of the House of Representatives fully empowered the Executive Committee to determine eligibility for press credentials, and that given the Rulemaking Clause, Courts are without jurisdiction to second guess such eligibility requirements or the exercise of that power by the Executive Committee.

=== Vigdor Schreibman and Federal Information News Syndicate ===
Vigdor Schreibman, a previously credentialed journalist who launched his own website entitled Federal Information News Syndicate (FINS), applied for credentials to the Periodical Press Galleries in 1996. The Executive Committee denied him credentials under Rule II, concluding that Schreibman was not a full-time journalist, he did not receive a salary, and that FINS was not published for profit. Schreibman appealed to the Speaker of the House and the Senate Committee on Rules and Administration, but neither took any action. Schreibman then filed suit in the U.S. District Court for the District of Columbia, which dismissed the suit as foreclosed by Consumers Union. Schreibman appealed, but the D.C. Circuit Court held Consumers Union indistinguishable and therefore controlling.
