= Indian Military Review =

- Language: English

Publication details
- History: 2009 - present
- Publisher: IMR Media Pvt Ltd.
- Frequency: Monthly

Standard abbreviations
- ISO 4: Indian Mil. Rev.

Indian Military Review (IMR) is an Indian defence monthly magazine. It was started by IDYB Group in December 2009. The first issue appeared in January 2010. It is published by IMR Media Pvt Ltd, part of the IDYB Group, which has been publishing military books since 1931. The Indian Defence Yearbook and Indian Military Review monthly magazine are the flagship publications of the IDYB Group. The Indian Military Review aims to stimulate the top brass intellectually and provides non-partisan analyses to middle level officers and is a source of information and learning for young officers.

Indian Military Review is edited by a team of retired service officers from the Indian Army, Indian Air Force and Indian Navy. Major General R. K. Arora is executive editor of the journal. General Arora commanded 12 Infantry Division of the Indian Army and was head of the Red Forces Branch of Army Training Command before seeking voluntary retirement in October 2009. Indian Military Review has been recommended by the USI of India, a think tank of the three Indian services, which runs UN peacekeeping programmes and correspondence courses for staff college course aspirants and for promotion examinations.

== Contents ==
Every month IMR carries articles related to major developments in the field of defence and security in the Indian sub-continent, neighbourhood, insurgency, internal and homeland security, armed forces' modernisation, paramilitary forces, defence research, military modernisation, military history and conferences & events.

Contents of the May 2013 issue can be seen here.

== Editorial board ==
The editorial board of IMR has the following :

1. Major General Ravi Arora
2. Air Marshal Bharat Kumar
3. Lt Gen DS Chauhan
4. Maj Gen Deepak Mehta
5. Lt Col Vijay S Bharthiae
6. Vijay Mahajan
7. Samir Narula

== Special content ==
Gannet Government Media Corp (GGMC) USA entered into a content sharing agreement with IMR Media Pvt Ltd in November 2011. IMR carries eight pages of content from Defense News published weekly by GGMC in every issue of IMR.

== Conferences and exhibitions ==
IMR Media produce quality defence conferences and exhibitions in India. The first of such events, UV India 2011, was held on 13–14 October 2011, in New Delhi, India. Events organised in 2012-13 included:

1. Military Simulation & Training 2012 – 21–22 June 2012.
2. Heli & UV India 2012 – 15–16 November 2012
3. Night Vision India 2013 16–17 January 2013.
4. CBRN India 2013 – 16–17 April 2013.
5. Precision Attack & Targeting India 2013 - 11–12 July 2013.

== See also ==
- 2.5 front war
