= Training & Simulation Journal =

American magazine

- Training & Simulation Journal, December 2011 issue
- Editor: Lauren Biron
- Categories: Military magazine
- Publisher: Elaine Howard
- Founded: 2000
- Company: Sightline Media Group
- Country: United States
- Based in: Springfield, Virginia
- Website: www.defensenews.com/training-and-simulation-journal
- ISSN: 1530-4159

Training & Simulation Journal (TSJ) was a website and magazine covering the global military training and modeling and simulation industries, published every two months. It was established in 2000 and discontinued by 2020.

The website included a range of news and features, as well as monthly game reviews. The magazines included previews of the two major modeling and simulation trade conferences, and the Interservice/Industry Training, Simulation and Education Conference.

Writers covered a broad range of topics relating to the military.

Examples of topics covered include technological innovations and new products, industry acquisitions, language and mobile learning, government budgets and training curricula, agency interoperability, robotics, war games, vehicle simulators (for tanks, helicopters, airplanes, convoys, and submarines), maintenance training, virtual reality systems, and weapons or tactical training (such as laser targeting systems, MOUTs, dismounted infantry simulator). TSJ also published interviews, technical briefings, and commentaries from outside contributors.

TSJ was published by the Sightline Media Group, currently owned by Regent, a Los Angeles-based private equity firm controlled by investor Michael Reinstein. It was founded by the Gannett division known as Gannett Government Media from 1997 to 2015, then became part of TEGNA, Inc.'s TEGNA Digital arm, before being sold to Regent in 2016.
