= Marine Corps Times =

Weekly newspaper about U.S. military branch

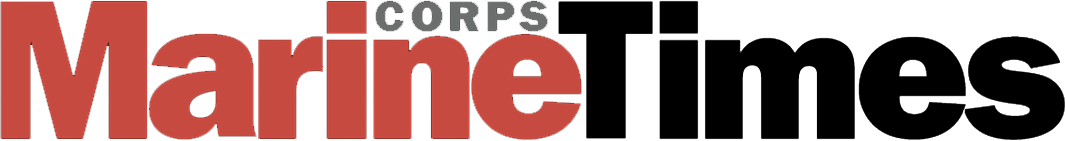

- Marine Corps Times cover 10 April 2017
- Type: Weekly newspaper
- Format: Tabloid
- Owner: Sightline Media Group
- Publisher: Michael Reinstein
- Founded: 1999
- Headquarters: 6883 Commercial Drive, Springfield, Virginia, United States
- Circulation: 36,385 (June 2013)
- ISSN: 1522-0869 (print); 2328-2258 (web)
- OCLC number: 40058477
- Website: marinecorpstimes.com

Marine Corps Times (ISSN 1522-0869) is an American newspaper serving active, reserve and retired United States Marine Corps personnel and their families, providing news, information and analysis as well as community and lifestyle features, educational supplements, and resource guides. It is published 26 times per year.

Marine Corps Times is published by the Sightline Media Group, which is owned by Regent, a Los Angeles-based private equity firm controlled by investor Michael Reinstein.

== History ==
Marine Corps Times traces its roots to the 1940s, when Army Times, founded by Mel Ryder, had reporters covering the U.S. Army Air Corps and Army Air Forces. The Army Times Publishing Company later added Air Force Times and Navy Times.

In 1997, the Ryder family sold Army Times Publishing Company to Gannett and renamed Gannett Government Media. Two years later, it launched Marine Corps Times.

Marine Corps Times writer C. Mark Brinkley was among the first journalists to embed with ground troops in Afghanistan in November 2001 during Operation Swift Freedom, which was the Pentagon's first opportunity to Embed Journalists.

In 2005, Marine Corps Times received an Associated Press Managing Editors association Award for Outstanding Achievement in the Field of Public Service in the under-40,000 circulation category for its investigative story on the recall of body armor.

Marine Corps Times and Brinkley were also responsible for exposing the fabricated military record claimed by Joshua Adam Garcia, a contestant on Food Network's 2007 season of "The Next Food Network Star", resulting in Garcia's resignation from the cooking competition reality show.

In November 2010, senior writer Dan Lamothe broke the news that the Marine Corps had recommended former Cpl. Dakota Meyer for the Medal of Honor, the nation's highest award for valor, for bravery in Afghanistan in September 2009. Meyer's case was approved in July 2011, making him the first living Marine to receive the medal since the Vietnam War.

In spring 2011, Lamothe received the Marine Corps Heritage Foundation's Maj. Megan McClung Award, which honors one journalist annually for dispatch reporting abroad. Lamothe was honored for his work in May and June 2010, when he embedded with 3rd Battalion, 6th Marines, in Afghanistan's Marjah district.

In fall 2011, Lamothe and staff photographer Thomas Brown received honorable mention from the Military Reporters and Editors organization for their blogging from the battlefield during the same embedded assignment. They finished behind The New York Times in MRE's online interactive award category.

In 2015, Gannett Government Media was renamed Sightline Media Group and spun off into one of the digital properties of TEGNA, Inc. In March 2016, TEGNA sold Sightline Media Group to Regent.

== Former personnel ==
- Leo Shane III, Capitol Hill bureau chief

== See also ==
- Air Force Times
- Army Times
- Navy Times
