= C4ISRNET =

American magazine

- Frequency: 9 per year
- Founded: 2002
- Company: Sightline Media Group
- Country: United States
- Website: c4isrnet.com

C^{4}ISRNET (previously C^{4}ISR, or C4ISR: The Journal of Net-Centric Warfare) is a publication covering emerging issues and trends in global military transformation and network centric warfare technologies, products and services for federal government managers, defense, and industry. It is published nine times per year.

== Activity ==
C^{4}ISRNET was established in 2002. The magazine is published by Sightline Media Group, which was a part of Gannett Company (NYSE:GCI). As part of the spinoff of digital and broadcasting properties in 2015, Gannett spun off these properties to Tegna. In March 2016, Tegna sold Sightline Media Group to Regent, a Los Angeles–based private equity firm controlled by investor Michael Reinstein. C^{4}ISRNET's headquarters is in Tysons, Virginia.

The 16th annual C^{4}ISRNET Conference was on May 3, 2017, at the Renaissance Arlington Capital View.
