= Emma Heming Willis =

British model (born 1976)

- Born: Emma Frances Heming; June 18, 1976 (age 50); Malta
- Citizenship: British / American
- Occupations: Model; actress; businesswoman
- Years active: 1991–present
- Spouse: Bruce Willis (m. 2009)
- Children: 2
- Modeling information
- Height: 5 ft 10 in (1.78 m)
- Hair color: Brown
- Eye color: Brown
- Agency: The Lions (New York, Los Angeles); Visage Management (Zürich)

Emma Frances Heming Willis (née Heming; born June 18, 1976) is a British-American model, actress, and businesswoman.

== Early life ==
Emma Frances Heming was born on June 18, 1976, in Malta to a British father and a Guyanese mother (of Indo-Guyanese ethnic origin). She was raised in north London and California.

== Career ==
In the early 1990s, Heming was discovered in the British morning television show The Big Breakfast's "The British Elle Supermodel" competition, with Lorraine Ashton model agency, which she won.

She was a spokesmodel for the Canadian lingerie retailer La Senza and has appeared in advertisements, including for Dior Bronze, Escada, Gap, Garnier, Intimissimi, John Frieda, Palmers, and Redken. She has appeared on the covers of Elle (Spain, France and Turkey), Elle Décor, Glamour, Shape, Town and Country, and W. In 2005, Maxim magazine placed her at number 86 in its "Top 100" list of the world’s most beautiful women. She has also walked the runway at fashion shows for brands such as Herve Leger, John Galliano, Paco Rabanne, Christian Dior, Chanel, Maska, Thierry Mugler, Valentino, Emanuel Ungaro, Ralph Lauren, and the Victoria's Secret Fashion Show. In 2014, she started writing a blog on her website, writing about motherhood, style, beauty and food. In January 2018, Heming Willis signed with The Lions Management.

In 2016, Heming Willis founded a vegan, sustainably created and chemical-free skin care brand called Coco Baba. Heming Willis and her husband Bruce teamed up with LR Health & Beauty to create fragrances. In 2012, Bruce launched his first women's fragrance, "Lovingly by Bruce Willis", with Heming-Willis starring in the perfume's advertisements. In 2016, she launched "Lightning Collection" in collaboration with LR Health & Beauty, consisting of three perfume compositions. In 2023, Heming Willis and Helen Christoni founded a wellness brand, Make Time, which sells supplements and vitamins focused on brain health. Make Time partners with Hilarity for Charity, a nonprofit organization, which supports families impacted by Alzheimer's disease and brain health research.

On September 9, 2025, The Open Field published Heming's memoir, The Unexpected Journey: Finding Hope and Purpose on the Caregiving Path. The book debuted at number two in the Advice, How-To & Miscellaneous section on The New York Times Best Seller list on September 28, 2025.

== Advocacy ==
In February 2023, Heming announced that her husband Bruce Willis was diagnosed with frontotemporal dementia (FTD). She has since become an advocate for dementia awareness, support for the lived experience of FTD for care partners and families, and research to end FTD and all forms of neurodegenerative disease. On November 11, 2023, she wrote an op-ed about frontotemporal dementia and the lessons she has learned for Maria Shriver's Sunday Paper.

== Personal life ==
On March 21, 2009, Heming married actor Bruce Willis in the Turks and Caicos Islands. The ceremony was not legally binding, and the couple were married again in a civil ceremony in Beverly Hills, six days later. The couple have two daughters, and Heming is also a stepmother to Willis' three elder daughters from his first marriage to Demi Moore. In August 2025, Heming revealed that she and Willis were now living in separate homes. Heming explained that the decision to live separate from Willis was arrived through family consensus, and on account of Willis' declining health, with Willis' new, separate one story home being better suited to accommodate his progressing frontotemporal dementia.

== Filmography ==
Film and television roles
Year	Title	Role	Notes
1998	Scrapbooks from Africa and Beyond	Herself	Model; Television film
2001	The Victoria's Secret Fashion Show	Herself	Model; Television special
2001	Perfume	Model #3	Film
2006	Entourage	Girl at Club	Episode: "Three's Company"
2007	Perfect Stranger	Donna	Film
2007	The Comebacks	Megan	Film
2013	Bruce Willis: Why the Legend Never Dies	Herself	Television film; also as producer
2013	Red 2	Kelly	Film
