= Ian Easton =

Ian Easton may refer to:

- Ian Easton (Royal Navy officer) (1917−1989), British admiral
- Ian M. Easton, American scholar on international relations'
