= La Senza =

Canadian fashion retailer

La Senza Corporation
- Type: Private
- Industry: Clothing
- Founded: 1990; 36 years ago
- Founder: Laurence Lewin; Irving Teitelbaum
- Headquarters: Columbus, Ohio, United States
- Number of locations: 277
- Products: Lingerie
- Owner: Regent LP
- Parent: L Brands (2006–2019)
- Website: LaSenza.ca

La Senza Corporation is a Canadian fashion retailer that sells women's lingerie and intimate apparel. The La Senza brand is currently owned by Regent which operates and owns La Senza stores in Canada and the United States and uses a franchise model for the operation of stores outside Canada and the United States.

At its peak, La Senza was the dominant lingerie retailer in Canada, with 322 corporate-owned stores across the country in January 2009. It also had 497 franchised international stores at that time, for a total of 819 locations. However, fierce competition by La Vie en Rose and other lingerie retailers resulted in La Senza losing its Canadian dominance, closing 248 domestic locations. As of September 2020, La Senza owns and operates 74 stores in Canada and one in the United States, and has a franchise agreement with 202 international stores, for a total of 277 locations worldwide.

== History ==
La Senza was founded in Canada by Laurence Lewin and Irving Teitelbaum, who opened the company's first store in 1990. In October 2006, La Senza was purchased by L Brands of Columbus, Ohio for $710 million CAD in cash, a company which already owned Victoria's Secret. By 2013, La Senza closed over two-thirds of its Canadian locations, including redundant and spin-off stores. Reasons for the brand's decline included discontinuing products that Canadians preferred, such as pyjamas, and to remove internal category duplication with Victoria's Secret. Stuart Burgdoerfer, vice-president and CFO of L Brands, said of La Senza: “There are signs of optimism there, but we are not at all accepting of the current result that we have.” By January 2017, there were 329 La Senza stores worldwide, including 122 in Canada and four in the United States.

As of 2019, La Senza employed over 2,000 associates globally. It currently operates 130 company-owned stores in the United States and Canada, and an additional 187 stores via its international franchise partners spanning 36 countries across the Middle East, North Africa, Latin America, Eastern Europe and Southeast Asia.

In January 2019, L Brands sold the La Senza business to Regent, a Beverly Hills-based private equity firm controlled by investor Michael Reinstein. In 2020, suppliers sought to push La Senza into Chapter 7 bankruptcy due to the company failing to pay rent at several of its locations.

== Products ==
La Senza's products focus on lingerie and nightwear but also include loungewear, daywear, and accessories. The concept is similar to that of Victoria's Secret, which is owned by La Senza’s previous parent company, L Brands corporation.

== Operating structure ==
From 2000 to 2006, La Senza was sold by L Brands in January 2019 to Regent and now operates as an independent company.

=== United States ===
La Senza also briefly operated in the United States from 2000 to 2006. In 2016, several La Senza stores opened in the United States on an experimental basis. This included two locations in L Brands' hometown Columbus, Ohio, at Easton Town Center and Polaris Fashion Place, and two locations in other states, including Orland Park, Illinois and Merrillville, Indiana. As of 2022, none of these locations are still in operation.

=== Franchise ===
==== La Senza UK ====
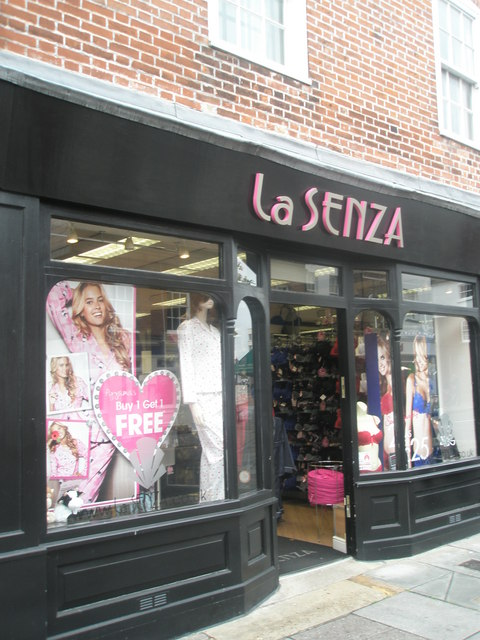
La Senza, Chichester

Businessman Theo Paphitis bought the United Kingdom and Ireland franchise, called La Senza UK, and began expanding it, eventually with sub-franchises in other parts of the European Union. In July 2006, Paphitis sold the company to private equity company Lion Capital, for a reported £100m. Paphitis left the board and is no longer a shareholder, and in Spring 2011, set up the new lingerie firm Boux Avenue.

On 23 December 2011, La Senza UK filed for administration citing "trading conditions" as one of the conditions for closure. The company stated that it had 2,600 UK staff at 146 stores and 18 concessions, and announced plans to close 80 stores.

On 9 January 2012, Kuwait based international retail franchise operator Alshaya announced it had reached agreement to take control of much of the ongoing La Senza business in the UK. Under an agreement with KPMG, administrators to La Senza UK, Alshaya UK Limited acquired exclusive franchise rights for the La Senza brand in the UK for an undisclosed sum. Alshaya said it would retain 60 stores, securing around 1,100 jobs while ensuring the continuation of a strong and popular brand on the UK high street. The deal and subsequent plans for the business, which included new product collections and store redesigns, represented a planned investment of around £100m in the UK retail sector over the next two years by Alshaya. Difficult trading conditions however continued and by June 2014 administrators were once again appointed to the struggling UK sector of the La Senza business. By this time the group was under the ownership of Marnixheath, which was operating 55 stores in the UK, employing 752 people.

L Brands later acquired all of the assets and intellectual property of the UK business.

== Production ==
La Senza manufactures some of its products near Kancheepuram in South India. La Senza operates out of malls in India as well.

Lola and Coco by La Senza was a leisurewear collection launched in 2008, promoted by British dance group Booty Luv. Another line launched in 2008 was inspired by The Pussycat Dolls and designed by the group's creator, Robin Antin. The collection uses fabrics imported from Italy and Spain.

La Senza previously owned and operated other labels, including La Senza Girl clothing stores for teenagers, as well as clothing for younger children, La Senza Express stores for bras and panties, and La Senza Spirit for activewear.

== Models and celebrity endorsements ==
Similar to Victoria's Secret, La Senza uses high-profile fashion models to endorse their product. Models such as Ginta Lapina, Emily DiDonato, Irina Shayk, Lauren Gold, Petra Němcová, Isabeli Fontana, Bianca Balti, Yamila Díaz, Doutzen Kroes, Daniela Pestova, Sophie Anderton, Rebecca Romijn, Caroline Winberg, Emma Heming, Jessica Stam, Maria Sokolovski, and Niclyn Rendall have been featured in an array of campaigns.
