= Sunset (magazine) =

American lifestyle magazine

Sunset Magazine
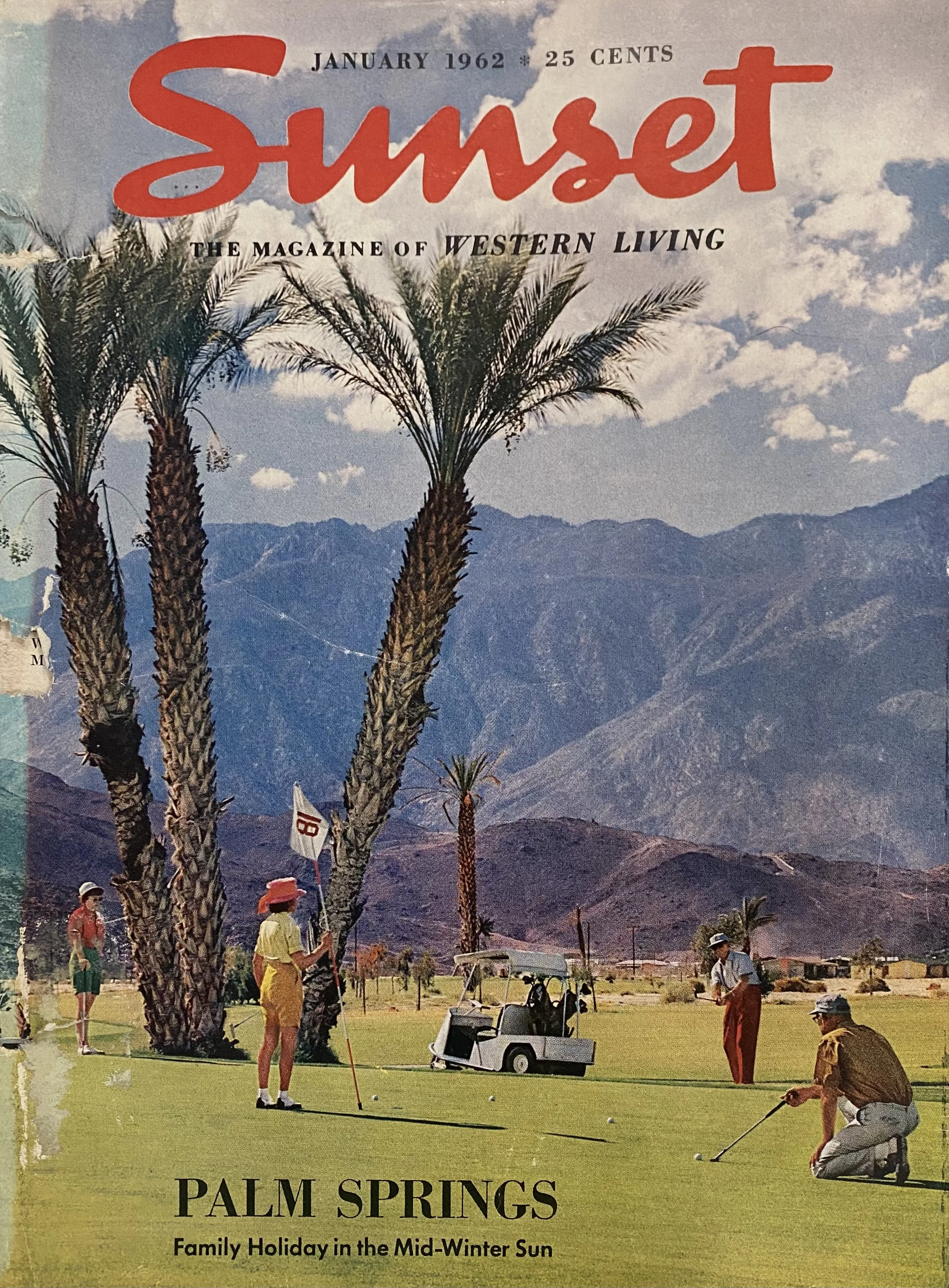
- Issue cover dated January 1962, featuring Palm Springs, California
- Editor: Hugh Garvey
- Frequency: Monthly
- Publisher: Michael Reinstein
- Total circulation: 1,262,587 (2014)
- First issue: 1898
- Company: Archetype (Regent, L.P.)
- Country: United States
- Based in: Oakland, California
- Language: English
- Website: www.sunset.com
- ISSN: 0039-5404

Sunset is a lifestyle magazine in the United States. Sunset focuses on homes, cooking, gardening, and travel, with a focus almost exclusively on the Western United States. The magazine is published six times per year by the Sunset Publishing Corporation which was sold by Time Inc. in November 2017 to Regent, a private equity firm led by investor Michael Reinstein. Regent formed the publisher Archetype in 2019 for its media holdings.

== History ==
=== Establishment ===
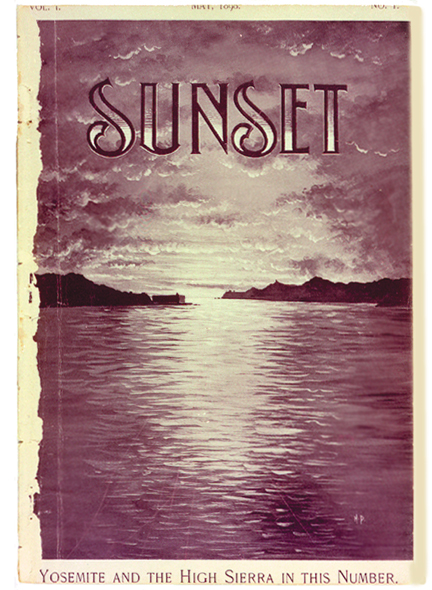
First edition cover

Sunset began in 1898 as a promotional magazine for the Southern Pacific Railroad, designed to combat the negative "Wild West" stereotypes about California.

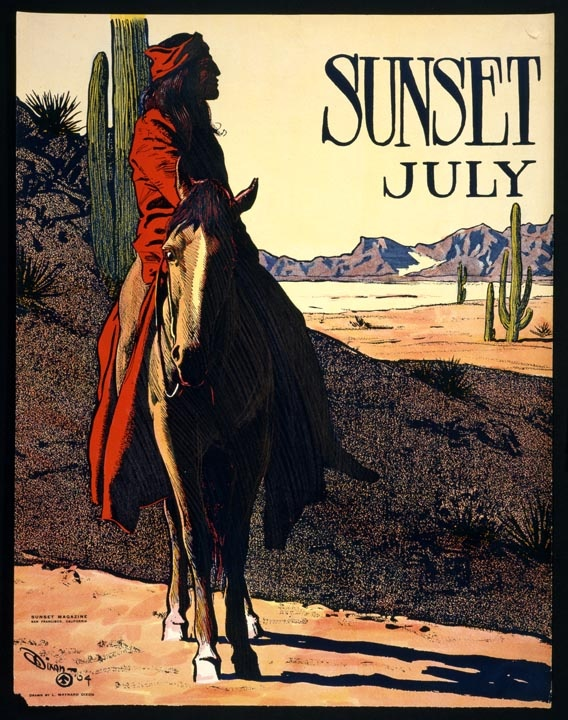
Sunset, July 1904, art by Maynard Dixon

The Sunset Limited was the premier train on the Southern Pacific Railroad's Sunset Route, which ran between New Orleans and San Francisco (the train is still in operation—from Los Angeles—as part of the national Amtrak system). Sunset Magazine was started to be available onboard and at the station, in order to promote the West. It aimed to lure tourists onto the company's trains, entice guests to the railroad's resort (the Hotel Del Monte in Monterey), and possibly encourage these tourists to stay and buy land, since the Southern Pacific was the largest single landowner in California and Nevada.

The inaugural issue featured an essay about Yosemite, with photographs by noted geologist Joseph LeConte. There was information about train travel, as well as social notes from Western resorts, such as this from Pasadena: "The aristocratic residence town of Southern California and rendezvous for the traveling upper ten has enjoyed a remarkably gay season and the hotel accommodations have been sorely taxed." Poetry featuring railroad themes and a later string of short stories in which characters swapped tall tales, always aboard a train, also highlighted travel by rail. Most of these early stories were penned by Paul Shoup, who later abandoned fiction to become president of the Southern Pacific.

=== Earthquake and recovery ===
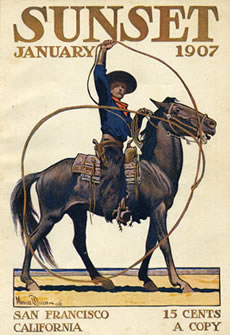
Sunset from January 1907. Cover illustration by Maynard Dixon.

On April 18, 1906, the 1906 San Francisco earthquake destroyed the Sunset offices. The May 1906 edition was a six-page emergency issue, in stark contrast to the 214-page April 1906 edition. The issue opened with a dire communiqué from E. H. Harriman, president of the Southern Pacific: "The earthquake on the morning of April 18th was the most severe that has occurred since San Francisco became a great city". Next came a message from Sunset's publishers: "This is to announce that by reason of the recent destruction by fire of the Sunset Magazine offices on April 18th, this Emergency Edition will be the only issue of the magazine for the month of May.… The priceless stock of drawing, photographs and engravings was burned.… In one day the accumulation and accomplishment of years were swept away".

Soon, however, the magazine was trumpeting its hometown's revival, in articles like "San Francisco's Future" and "How Things Were Righted After the Fire of 1906". In "A San Francisco Pleasure Cure", an early story by Sinclair Lewis published in the magazine, a tired businessman revived himself through a visit to the rebuilt city.

Southern Pacific purchased the Portland-based Pacific Monthly in 1912, and merged it with Sunset, to form Sunset: The Pacific Monthly. By 1914, the magazine had built strong national circulation and reputation, and the Southern Pacific sold the magazine to William Woodhead & Co., a group of employees who wished to continue the focus on the American West, but less corporate influence. The Theodore Roosevelt administration indicted the editor, writer, photographer, and aviator associated with a story entitled "Can the Panama Canal be destroyed from the air?" citing national security concerns; the magazine was still owned by the Southern Pacific when the story was published.

The publishers announced their ambitions in the December 1914 issue. Among the promises were reporting from war correspondent Arthur Street, who the magazine sent to Asia to cover the impacts of war and the opening of the Panama Canal on the world; reporting in North America supported by the purchase of a new automobile; coverage of international expositions such as the Panama–Pacific International Exposition; responses to inquiries of a newly-established service bureau, to field questions from readers about relocating to the western U.S. and other matters; and a renewed commitment to fiction and photography.

By 1914, Sunset had begun to publish original articles, stories and poetry focusing on the West. The format resembled other national general interest magazines of the day such as Collier's and The Saturday Evening Post. The new owners sought to "make the magazine a vehicle of Western thought and to steer the magazine into a national market," according to Stanford University librarian Tomas Jaehn. Sunset reported on heavy political and economic issues; contributors included Stanford president David Starr Jordan discussing international affairs, future U.S. president Herbert Hoover discussing the League of Nations and the former governor of California and senator Hiram Johnson discussing United States politics. Fiction and poetry became more ambitious, featuring authors such as Jack London, Dashiell Hammett, Mary Austin, and evangelist Aimee Semple McPherson.

Sunset cover art in its early years was of high quality, with the early 20th century being the golden age of magazine illustration. Contributors of cover art included Will James, Maynard Dixon, and Cornelia Barns.

=== The Lane Publishing era ===
In the 1920s, the magazine became unprofitable, as it grew thinner and its circulation dwindled. In 1929, Lawrence W. Lane, a former advertising executive with Better Homes and Gardens, purchased Sunset, and changed the format to its current Western lifestyle emphasis. The magazine became focused toward a female audience. The Lane family would own Sunset for the next 62 years.

During the Depression, weighty ruminations on politics and economics were replaced with frivolous articles like March 1935's "Little Toes, What Now?", which began "This is the season when all the little toes are going not to market, but to have a pedicure".

Eventually, a meatier magazine emerged. Sunset began "Kitchen Cabinet", a readers' recipes feature (still featured as "Reader Recipes"). Essays on home architecture became more specifically geared to the West, with a series of sumptuously photographed articles championing the Western ranch house. Travel and garden coverage grew similarly focused and specific. In 1932, Sunset was the first national magazine to publish separate editions for different parts of its circulation area, tailoring its gardening advice to each area.

Sunset eliminated the use of bylines, and articles were increasingly how-to, giving it a voice of authority and efficiency. It was a successful formula: by 1938 the magazine was again profitable.

Under Lane's leadership, the company also produced a successful series of how-to home improvement and gardening books, which are still published today.

=== Sunset at War ===
Sunset initially treated World War II as if it were a temporary irritation, but it soon mobilized for war. One story featured newly minted aviation cadets at the Santa Ana Army Air Base. Aware that the federal government's victory garden tips did not always fit Western soils and climates, magazine editors planted their own 1-acre (4,000 m^{2}) test plot near UC Berkeley so that they could give their own advice.

In 1943, Sunset devised a new motto: "The Magazine of Western Living."

At the end of World War II, Sunset presented a series featuring innovative plans for homes to be built once the war was won, by architects including Portland's Pietro Belluschi and Los Angeles's Harwell Hamilton Harris.

When Lane took over the magazine, the population of the West was booming. A few years later, the end of World War II brought an explosion of newcomers. Drawing on his experience from the East Coast-serving Better Homes and Gardens, he guessed correctly that these new Westerners would be hungry for information about how to travel, cook, cultivate, and build in their new environment.

=== Building Sunset headquarters ===
For its first five decades, Sunset was headquartered in various downtown San Francisco office buildings. In 1951, the headquarters was moved to Menlo Park, California, a suburb located 25 miles (40 km) south of San Francisco. The 9-acre (36,000 m^{2}) parcel was a remnant of a 19th-century estate owned by the Hopkins family. This land was originally a part of a grant to Don Jose Arguello, governor of Spanish California in 1815. Its new headquarters was designed by Cliff May, known for his designs of ranch-style houses, which had been featured in Sunset for two decades. May created a long, low, adobe homestead that surrounded a central courtyard. The central courtyard, or the Sunset Gardens, were designed by the landscape artist Thomas Church.

For a while, Sunset referred to the Menlo Park headquarters as the Laboratory of Western Living. Its test kitchen processes thousands of recipes a year. It tested its gardening advice in its 3,000 sq ft editorial test gardens, which was designed to achieve high performance in tight spaces. Roughly 50% of Sunset's garden photography was taken in this area.

=== Time Warner era ===
Lane Publishing, including Sunset Magazine and books, was sold to Time Warner in 1990, and the company was renamed Sunset Publishing Corporation. A purchase price of $225 million for the magazine and its related assets was announced. The first issue of the magazine under Time Warner was published in August 1990.

In the 1990s, the franchise began to lose touch with its demographic, who viewed the magazine as something of their parents' era. Newer, fresher-looking lifestyle magazines, such as Martha Stewart Living and Real Simple, presented Sunset with competition. The magazine remained highly profitable, however, generating $28 million profit for Time Warner in 2000 on gross revenues of $78 million.

In 2001, Time Warner reorganized Sunset to be part of Southern Progress Corporation, best known for its similar home and lifestyle magazine Southern Living (its similarity to Sunset is no coincidence: its founders came out West to see how the Lanes did it in the early 1960s).. When Katie Tamony took over as editor-in-chief in 2001, she collaborated with new creative director Mia Daminato (former creative director for Australian-based Federal Publishing Company's Magazine Group) to create a new, more modern design.

The Menlo Park campus at 80 Willow Road was sold to a San Francisco real estate development firm by Time Warner in 2014 for more than $75 million.

In June 2015, Sunset announced it would be moving its headquarters to Jack London Square (Oakland, California). The new offices opened in December 2015, and the magazine's outdoor kitchen and test gardens were relocated to Cornerstone Sonoma, a winery in nearby Sonoma County, California. The magazine's extensive archival collection, including numerous original photographs and administrative papers, would not be brought to the new Oakland location, and was acquired by Stanford University.

=== Sale to Regent and investor Michael Reinstein ===
On November 30, 2017 Time Inc. sold Sunset to Regent, L.P. a global private equity firm led by Beverly Hills based investor Michael Reinstein. Sale price of the magazine, including both its assets and liabilities, was estimated at $12 million — a fraction of the publication's value during its heyday. After sale of the magazine to Regent, Sunset launched a round of personnel cuts, leaving it with fewer than 20 employees, a mere one-fifth of its staff just five years previously.

The publication had suffered a loss of advertising revenue its previous years, which in 2017 pushed the magazine's operating income into the red for the first time since 1938, with a loss of about $4 million posted on nearly $28 million in gross revenue. A cash-flow crisis ensued, with several freelance writers complaining in the Summer of 2017 that payment for published works had been delayed, with one particularly vocal writer noting that he had been forced to wait more than four months after invoicing to receive a check for his work.

The company additionally downgraded its offices, with staff moved in September 2018 from the Jack London Square offices to a less costly facility located several blocks away. Food preparation, an important part of the magazine's content, began to be done at an externally-located kitchen in Mountain View.

In March 2020, with the magazine struggling financially due to loss of advertising revenue during the COVID-19 pandemic, the company put most of its employees on unpaid leave. During the pandemic, the company briefly ceased printing the magazine but returned to print with the December 2020 issue.

== Western Home Awards program ==
Since 1957, Sunset's Western Home Awards program, cosponsored by the American Institute of Architects, has introduced readers to works by Richard Neutra, Charles Moore, Frank Gehry, and Calvin C. Straub, among other notables.

== House of Innovation ==
The "House of Innovation" is an experimental showcase house, opened on September 8, 2006, in Alamo, California. It is a collaboration between Sunset and Popular Science. It is part of the "Idea House" program, originally launched in 1998.

== Environmental reporting ==
Sunset's commentary has contributed to the debate on natural features including the Mojave Desert, the Tongass National Forest and the western U.S. National Parks. Occasionally, it has called for pro-environmental action, as it did with its 1969 article demanding a ban on DDT.
