= Dan Lamothe =

American journalist and author

- Born: Chicopee, Massachusetts, U.S.
- Education: University of Massachusetts (BA)
- Occupation: Journalist
- Employer: The Washington Post

Dan Lamothe is an American journalist, author and staff writer of The Washington Post.

== Career ==
=== Marine Corps Times ===
In November 2010, senior writer Dan Lamothe broke the news that the Marine Corps had recommended former Cpl. Dakota Meyer for the Medal of Honor, the nation's highest award for valor, for bravery in Afghanistan in September 2009. Meyer's case was approved in July 2011, making him the first living marine to receive the medal since the Vietnam War.

In spring 2011, Lamothe received the Marine Corps Heritage Foundation's Maj. Megan McClung Award, which honors one journalist annually for dispatch reporting abroad. Lamothe was honored for his work in May and June 2010, when he embedded with 3rd Battalion, 6th Marines, in Afghanistan's Marjah district.

In fall 2011, Lamothe and staff photographer Thomas Brown received honorable mention from the Military Reporters and Editors organization for their blogging from the battlefield during the same embedded assignment. They finished behind The New York Times in MRE's online interactive award category.

=== Washington Post ===
Dan joined the Washington Post in 2014, after having written for Foreign Policy the year before.
