= Navy Times =

American newspaper

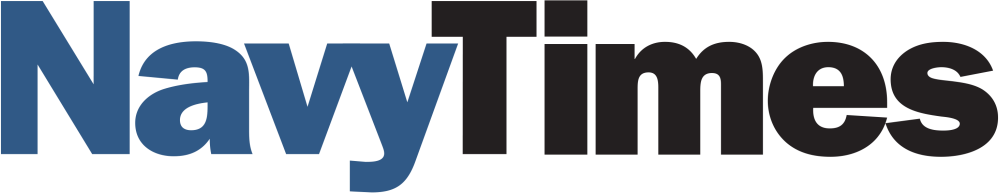

- Navy Times cover April 24, 2017
- Type: Newspaper
- Format: Tabloid
- Owner: Sightline Media Group
- Publisher: Michael Reinstein
- Editor: Carl Prine
- Founded: 1951
- Headquarters: 1919 Gallows Road, Suite 400, Tysons Corner, VA 22182, US
- Circulation: 55,482 (June 2013)
- ISSN: 0028-1697
- OCLC number: 03511129
- Website: navytimes.com

Navy Times (ISSN 0028-1697) is an American newspaper published 26 times per year serving active, reserve and retired United States Navy personnel and their families, providing news, information, analysis, community lifestyle features, educational supplements, and resource guides. Navy Times also reports on the United States Coast Guard. Navy Times is published by Sightline Media Group, a portfolio company of private equity firm Regent.

== History ==
Navy Times was founded by Mel Ryder, owner of Army Times Publishing Company, in 1951.

Ryder began his newspaper career on the staff of Stars and Stripes, selling and delivering papers to the troops on the front lines during World War I. In 1921, he joined Willard Kiplinger in forming the Kiplinger Agency, a newsletter service. He sold his interest in the agency in 1933 and began publishing Happy Days, a paper for members of the Civilian Conservation Corps. His first order was for 400 copies and the first advertiser was GEICO. In 1940, Ryder started and incorporated the Army Times newspaper.

In 1997, Army Times Publishing Company was sold to Gannett, and later renamed Gannett Government Media. In June 2009, Navy Times started its "Scoop Deck" blog.

In 2015, the GGM group was spun off as part of TEGNA, Gannett's broadcast and digital-only business group. GGM was later renamed Sightline Media Group.

In 2016, TEGNA sold Sightline to Regent, a Los Angeles–based private equity firm.

== Awards ==
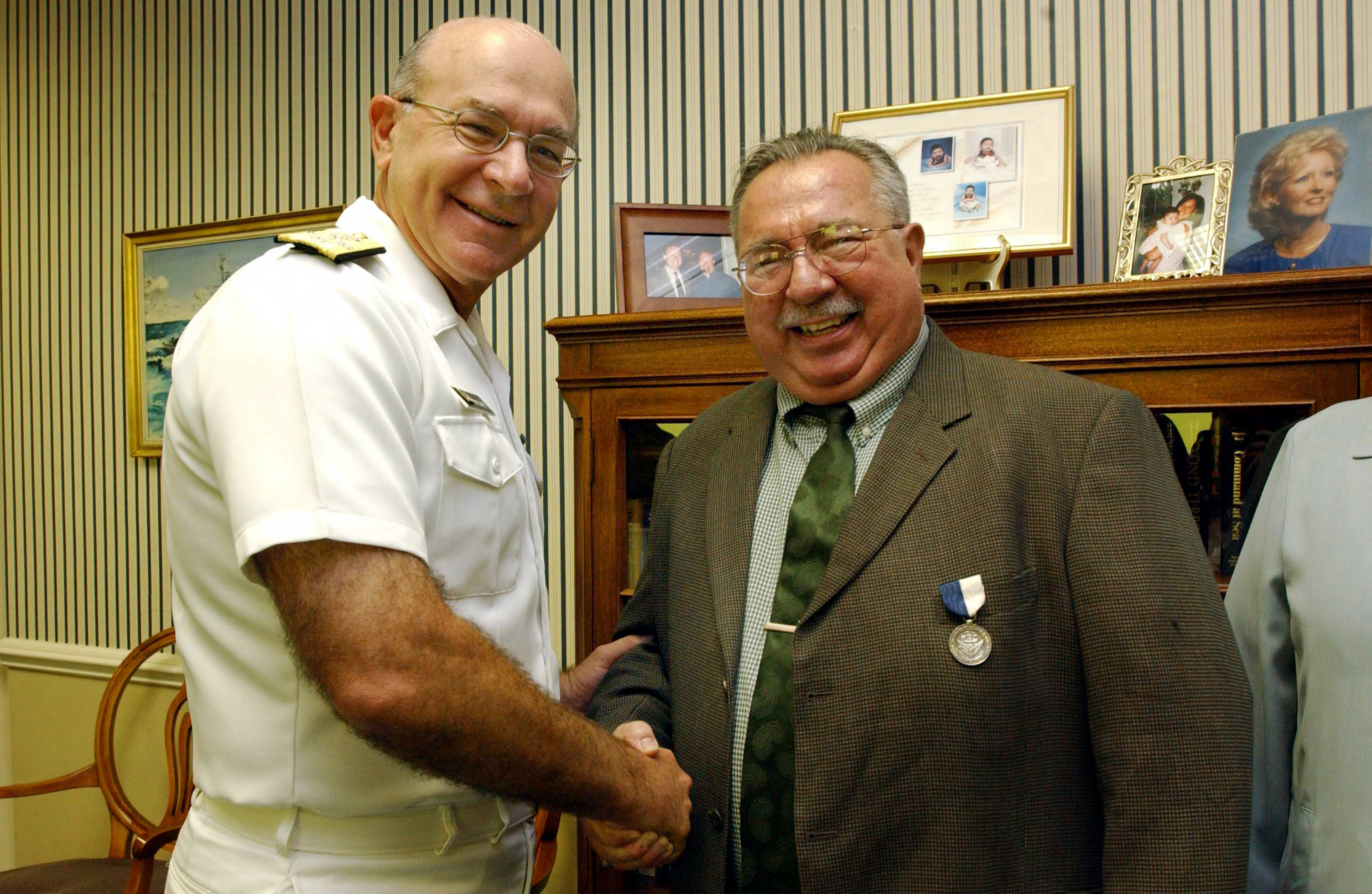
John Burlage receiving the United States Navy Superior Public Service Award in 2002

In 2002, then-Senior Staff Writer John Burlage, received the United States Navy's Superior Public Service Award for a journalism career that spanned 25 years as an enlisted Navy journalist and 18 more years working for Navy Times.

== Military Times Service Member of the Year ==
Each year Military Times honors an "Everyday Hero": "Someone with whom you are proud to serve. Someone whose dedication, professionalism and concern for fellow service members and community set a standard for all of us. There is a Marine of the year, Soldier of the year, Sailor of the year, Airman of the year and Coast Guardsman of the year. Each service member is nominated by their peers for Military Times selection." The winners are honored at a formal ceremony on Capitol Hill, in Washington, D.C.

== See also ==
- Air Force Times
- Army Times
- Marine Corps Times
