= Bruno Sälzer =

German business executive (born 1957)

- Born: June 28, 1957 (age 69); Bad Rappenau, Germany
- Education: Doctorate in logistics
- Alma mater: University of Mannheim
- Occupations: Chairman & CEO of Bench

Bruno Sälzer (born 28 June 1957) was the CEO of Escada, the international luxury fashion group. He was born into a farming family. He has always been interested in fashion more than fertiliser, and has been quoted in saying, "I can't explain this. There was no one in my family like this. I have checked back several generations." He is the father of four sons.

== Career ==
Timeline:

- 1986-1991: Director of International Sales Coordination, Beiersdorf
- 1991-1995: Managing Director of Hairdressing International, Schwarzkopf
- 1995-2008: CEO, Hugo Boss
- 2008–2014: CEO, Escada
- 2014–2018: CEO, Bench

Sälzer started out at Hugo Boss as one of the members of the managing board, but steadily worked his way up to CEO position. He was the first to introduce the womenswear line at Hugo Boss. He saw the company boost its income to €154m in 2007. During his time with the company, he described his management style as old-fashioned, he favored a system where you learn how to think, how to combine things, how to set priorities. He was not a fan of MBAs. Following a dispute with the company's private equity company Permira, Sälzer left Hugo Boss and took up the CEO position in Escada, replacing Jean-Marc Loubier. The row with Permira reportedly centred on special dividends, however the departure was supposed to have been amicable. Upon leaving, he praised the work ethic and unique culture of the company. His departure from the company saw Hugo Boss' stock fall by 9.2 percent in Frankfurt trading.

At Escada, Sälzer was employed to save the brand, which has steadily declined after the death of its co-founder Margaretha Ley. In 2008, he invested €3 million from his Hugo Boss severance pay, only to lose it, as the brand filed for bankruptcy. Megha Mittal, a member of an Indian steelmaking company, bought Escada and saved the company in 2009. Sälzer was retained as CEO, and thanked for his "relentless efforts" so far at the firm.

On 20 February 2014, according to Women's Wear Daily, Salzer will step down as CEO of Escada by December 2014.

In July 2014, it was announced that Sälzer alzer would take up the role of CEO and chairman of the Bench fashion brand on 1 December, commenting, "Bench fashion is an expression of young people's attitude towards life in the age of the internet and social media: individual, casual and with an eye for their own style. This exciting brand appeals to a target group which is of increasing importance for the fashion industry. What is important for me is that I am able to have a long-term entrepreneurial stake in Bench."

Sälzer is board member of Lacoste, Paris, since 2013, of Deichmann SE, Essen, since 2008 and of Amer Sports, Helsinki, since 2008. In March 2017 he was elected as chairman of Amer Sports. He retained this function until the takeover of Amer Sports Corp. by Anta Sports Limited, Jinjiang, China, in April 2019.

In 2018, Sälzer took on a supervisory board mandate at Ludwig Beck AG in Munich, and in July 2020 he became chairman of the supervisory board. Since 2020, Sälzer has been a member of the board of directors of Zino Davidoff SA in Basel. From 2021 to 2023, he took on the role of Executive Advisor in the management of AlphaTauri, Red Bull's premium fashion brand. As part of the IPO on the New York Stock Exchange in February 2024, Sälzer has returned to Amer Sports as Lead Independent Director.
