= Air Force Times =

American newspaper

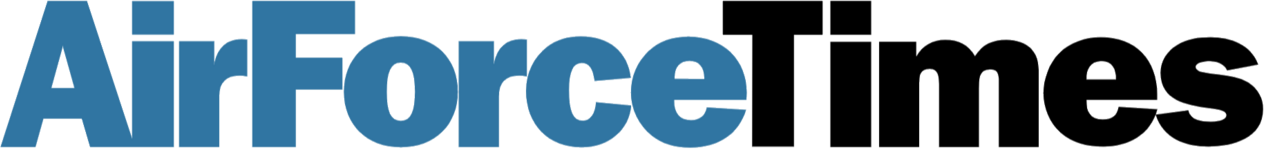

- Air Force Times cover 10 April 2017
- Type: Tabloid-sized newspaper
- Format: Tabloid
- Owner: Sightline Media Group
- Publisher: Michael Reinstein
- Founded: 1947
- Headquarters: 6883 Commercial Drive, Springfield, Virginia 22159, United States
- Circulation: 53,057 (June 2013)
- ISSN: 0002-2403
- Website: airforcetimes.com

Air Force Times is an American newspaper published 26 times per year to provide active, reserve and retired United States Air Force and Air National Guard personnel and their families with news, information, analysis, community and lifestyle features, educational supplements, and resource guides. It is published by the Sightline Media Group, which is a part of Regent.

The publication was founded in 1947 by the Army Times Publishing Company, later called the Times Journal Company. Some years after ATPCO was sold to Gannett in 1997, the company was renamed Gannett Government Media. In 2015, the company was spun off into one of the digital properties of TEGNA, Inc. and renamed Sightline Media Group. In March 2016, TEGNA sold Sightline to Regent, a Los Angeles-based private equity firm controlled by investor Michael Reinstein.

Each year, Air Force Times names an Airman of the Year, nominated by his peers and honored at a ceremony on Capitol Hill, in Washington, D.C.

== History ==
Air Force Times was founded by Mel Ryder, who began his newspaper career during World War I, selling and delivering Stars and Stripes to troops on the front lines. In 1921, Ryder joined Willard Kiplinger in forming the Kiplinger Agency newsletter service. He sold his interest in the agency in 1933 and began publishing Happy Days, a paper written for members of the Civilian Conservation Corps; his first order was for 400 copies and the first advertiser was GEICO. In the 1940s, Ryder founded Army Times, with reporters covering the U.S. Army Air Corps and U.S. Army Air Forces. With the creation of the U.S. Air Force in 1947 came the birth of Air Force Times as a separate newspaper.

== Subscriptions and readership ==
As of 2007, according to Military Times figures, one in four subscribers was a member of the active-duty Air Force, while nearly one in 10 subscribers was a member of the Air Force Reserve. Weekly newsstand buyers totaled some 11,600, with 79 percent of newsstand sales to members of the active-duty Air Force and 9 percent to members of the Air Force Reserve.

In 2009, weekly subscribers totaled 43,800, with a total readership about one-third larger.

== See also ==
- Army Times
- Marine Corps Times
- Navy Times
