= InfoWorld =

Information technology media business

- March 26, 2007 cover of InfoWorld
- First issue: 11 December 1978; 47 years ago
- Final issue: 2 April 2007 (since published online)
- Company: FoundryCo, Inc. (Regent LP)
- Country: United States
- Based in: San Francisco
- Language: English
- Website: www.infoworld.com
- ISSN: 0199-6649

InfoWorld (IW) is an American information technology media business that began as a monthly magazine in 1978, but transitioned to a Web publication in 2007. Having Macworld and PC World as its sister publications, it has been owned by Regent LP since 2025.

== Overview ==
Based in San Francisco, IW has contributors and supporting staff based across the U.S. Since its founding, InfoWorld's readership has largely consisted of IT and business professionals.

InfoWorld focuses on how-to, analysis, and editorial content from a mixture of experienced technology journalists and working technology practitioners. The site averages 4.6 million monthly page views and 1.1 million monthly unique visitors.

== History ==
InfoWorld, the weekly paper of the personal-computer industry ... has enough gossip, shoptalk, and scandal to be interesting even if you don't get excited about computers.

— Edward Mendelson in The Yale Review, 1986

The magazine was founded by Jim Warren in 1978 as The Intelligent Machines Journal (IMJ).

In February 1980, one year after being sold to International Data Group (IDG), the magazine changed its name to InfoWorld. In 1986, the Robert X. Cringely column began; for many, that pseudonymous column was the face of InfoWorld and its close ties to Silicon Valley in particular.

Up to and including the 15 June 1987 issue 24, volume 9, InfoWorld was published by Popular Computing, Inc., a subsidiary of CW Communications, Inc. Since then, it has been published by InfoWorld Publishing, Inc., a subsidiary of IDG Communications, Inc.

Ethernet inventor Bob Metcalfe was CEO and publisher from 1991 to 1996, and contributed a weekly column until 2000. As the magazine transitioned to be exclusively Web-based, the final print edition was dated 2 April 2007 (Volume 29, Issue 14, Number 1384).

In its web incarnation, InfoWorld has transitioned away from widely available news stories to a focus on how-to, expert testing, and thought leadership.
