= United States Senate Daily Press Gallery =

Media gallery of the US Congress

The U.S. Senate Daily Press Gallery, along with the House Daily Press Gallery, the House and Senate Periodical Press Galleries, the House and Senate radio and Television Galleries, and the Senate Photographers’ Gallery, are the four media galleries of the United States Congress. The Senate Daily Press Gallery is located in the Senate wing of the United States Capitol. The gallery staff assist correspondents generally and maintain their access to Senate proceedings. The gallery includes the press seats that overlook the Senate floor and the surrounding offices where reporters work. Gallery staff track floor action, tally votes, and coordinate coverage of Senate news conferences and hearings.

Journalists operating out of the Press Gallery help members communicate with the public, and provide the public with the ability to observe elected officials throughout the legislative process. In the earliest Congresses, few official documents were kept, so news reports often provided the most comprehensive record of congressional proceedings, even for members themselves. The House and Senate established formal press galleries in 1877.

The Senate Daily Press Gallery operates under Rule XXXIII of the Standing Rules of the United States Senate. Under these rules, the Speaker of the House and the Senate Committee on Rules and Administration maintain final authority over all the press galleries.

== History ==
In the early years relatively few newspapers covered Congress, and those that did depended on subsidies from political parties, who, in return for their patronage, provided favorable coverage of the respective party. The advent of Penny Press in the 1830s disrupted this system, as it relied on sales rather than patronage from a political party for the support of newspapers. The Whigs made sweeping gains in the 1840 elections, winning the presidency and a majority in Congress. James Gordon Bennett, owner of the Democratic New York Herald, had lobbied to win his reporters access to the Senate floor, but Senate President Pro Tempore Samuel Southard was not keen on rewarding reporters from the opposition newspaper. Incensed, Bennett turned to a sympathetic Henry Clay who placated Bennett by establishing the Senate’s first “Reporters’ gallery”, on July 8, 1841. Two desks were reserved for each of the Washington daily newspapers, and one was assigned to each out-of-town paper that applied. Before the establishment of the reporters’ gallery, reporters who were not granted floor privileges were forced to find a seat in the general gallery with the public, where it could be difficult to hear floor proceedings.

In 1877, the House and Senate created a committee of correspondents to oversee press gallery membership and administration. The Official Congressional Directory published a list of 86 correspondents granted access in 1880. Galleries are now separated into daily printed press, periodical press, radio and television press, and press photographers, each with their own correspondents’ committees. In 2008, the gallery underwent a full-scale renovation which widened aisles, added new desks and modernized the office.

== Current operations ==
Today, the congressional press galleries provide services both for journalists and for Members of Congress. Each press gallery is typically responsible for credentialing journalists for the chamber it represents. The galleries also maintain Capitol workspace for correspondents, and coordinate coverage for news conferences, hearings, and other congressional events. Additionally, they distribute press releases; provide the press with information on floor proceedings, upcoming rules, amendments, and legislation; provide information on committee hearings, witness testimony, and mark-ups; and deliver messages or facilitate Member communications with journalists.

The House and Senate press galleries take on additional roles during presidential elections, overseeing arrangements and credentialing for daily press at the national political conventions and presidential inaugurations.

The professional staff who operate the galleries report to the Senate Sergeant at Arms and the Senate Committee on Rules and Administration.

== Accreditation ==
The Senate gallery handles accreditation for daily newspapers, wire services and electronic news organizations that cover both the Senate and the House of Representatives.

Applicants are vetted by The Standing Committee of Correspondents. This committee is composed of five journalists who are elected to two-year terms by the other members of the gallery. This system helps preserve the independence of the press corps by insulating it from congressional influence. It also maintains journalistic integrity, as the rules agreed upon by the gallery members reflect commonly held professional norms and standards of the news industry. Correspondents’ committee members must remain employed as journalists.

In order to gain membership in the Daily Press Gallery, applicants must be “bona fide correspondents of repute in their profession”. They must be full-time, paid correspondents of recognized news organizations in a position that requires on-site access to Senate and House members and staff. Additionally, applicants must reside in the Washington, D.C. area, and “must not be engaged in any lobbying or paid advocacy, advertising, publicity or promotion work for any individual, political party, corporation, organization, or agency of the U.S. government.”

Although the Standing Committee of Correspondents is responsible for accreditation decisions, the Senate press gallery office acts as a liaison between the committee and the journalists, processing applications, supporting materials, or fees submitted by journalists.
