= Danish Parliamentary Press Gallery =

- Folketingets Presseloge
- Formation: 1918; 108 years ago
- Type: Private voluntary association
- Headquarters: Christiansborg Palace, Copenhagen
- Members: 142 (2024)
- Chairwoman: Rikke Gjøl Mansø

The Danish Parliamentary Press Gallery (Danish: Folketingets Presseloge), also known as the Press Gallery of the Folketing, is an accredited press gallery association established in 1918 to oversee the conduct and professional responsibilities of journalists and photographers working at Christiansborg Palace and for covering the proceedings and activities of the Danish Parliament (Danish: Folketinget).

Membership of the press gallery is subject to approval by the Presidium of the Danish Parliament. Historically, its members enjoyed privileged access to parliamentary and governmental documents; however, following the establishment of the Folketing's official website, access to such materials has become publicly available. Today, the association primarily functions as a liaison between the leadership of the Folketing and political journalists, particularly with regard to practical and administrative matters, including journalists’ access to Christiansborg Palace and the editorial offices in the building. The association annually awards the Fjæsing Prize (Danish: Fjæsingprisen), named after the stinging greater weever fish. The prize recognises a piece of journalism that has notably challenged or caused political difficulty for a politician during the year.

The current chair is Rikke Gjøl Mansø, a journalist at the Danish Broadcasting Corporation (DR), who succeeded Marchen Neel Gjertsen in 2019.

== History ==
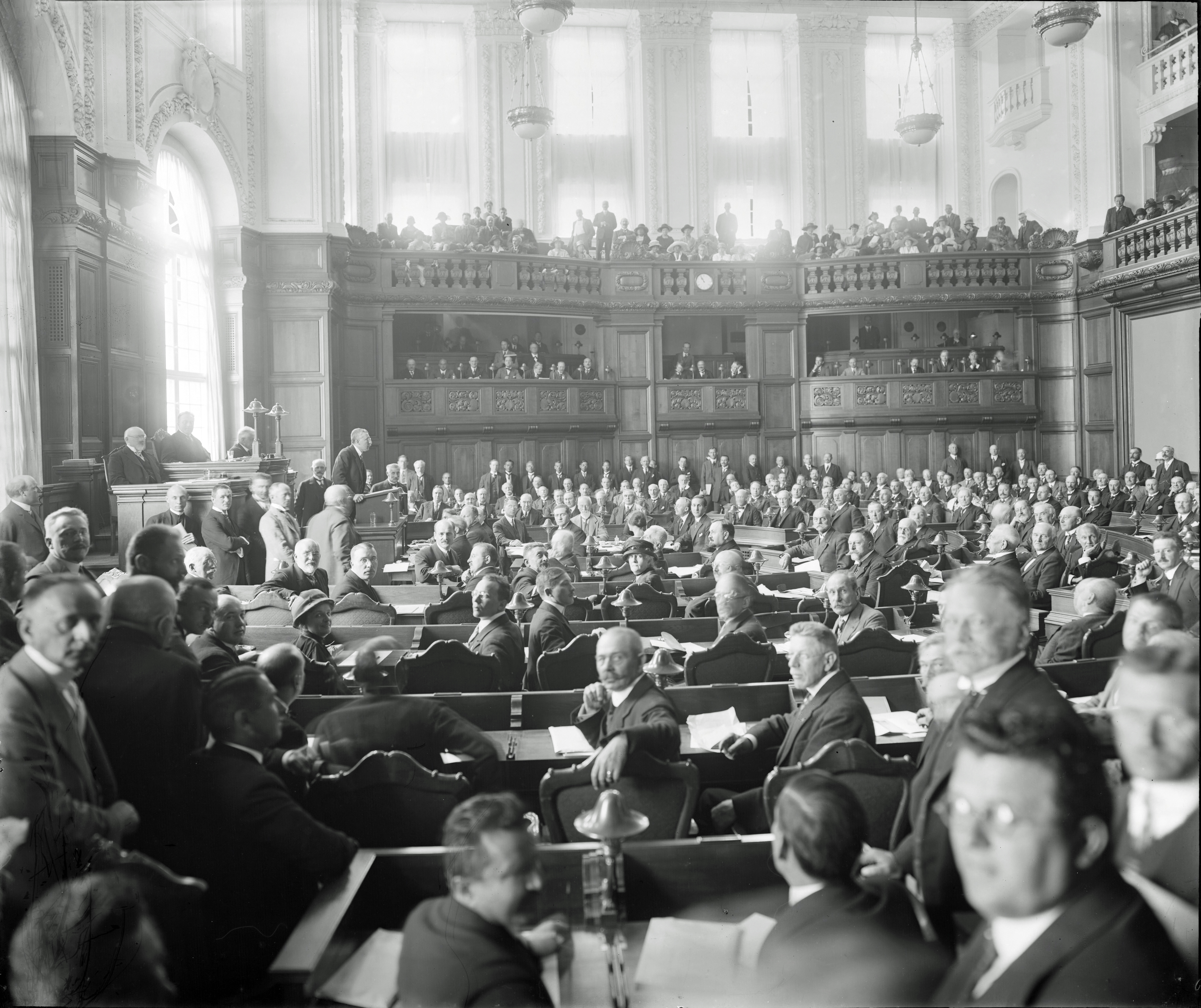
The Parliamentary chamber in 1923. In the background, the press gallery can be seen.

The Press Gallery traces its origins to early 20th-century political journalists, known then as reporters of the Rigsdag (Danish: rigsdagsreferenter), who sought better working conditions while parliament was temporarily relocated to Fredericiagade during the rebuilding of Christiansborg after the 1884 fire. Originally, journalists enjoyed only the same limited access rights as ordinary citizens. Through collective organization, three prominent reporters, H.J. Blicher, G. Chr. Olsen, and A.J. Poulsen, negotiated directly with the presiding officers of the Rigsdag (Landsting and Folketing) and with the architect of the new Christiansborg, achieving dedicated facilities once parliament returned there in 1918.

From that point on, Presseloge members enjoyed reserved spaces, including press galleries (Danish: referentloger) in both Folketingssalen and Landstingssalen, equipped with telephone booths and a pneumatic tube system that enabled swift dispatch of reports to newspaper offices. In December 1918, Rigsdagens Press Gallery (later known as Folketinget's Press Gallery) held its first general assembly, formalizing the association's role as a professional body representing accredited journalists at Christiansborg. By 1919, it had begun an annual tradition of gatherings, such as the first Press Gallery dinner hosted at Restaurant Nimb, attended by senior politicians and party leaders.

It was described in the 1919 official yearbook as the association of regularly attending parliamentary correspondents of Danish newspapers and news agencies, who were assigned fixed seats in the reporters’ galleries. Through its board, the Press Gallery was tasked with negotiating agreements with the Rigsdag’s presiding officers and administrative bureau on the conditions governing journalists’ work within the parliamentary premises.

Within the Folketing chamber, a designated press gallery is situated on the first floor behind the ministers’ benches. Access to this gallery is restricted to journalists who maintain offices at Christiansborg Palace and are members of the association.

Historically, the association included both parliamentary journalists and a smaller number of journalists employed by the political parties’ press services. In January 2024, the Presidium of the Folketing, acting on a recommendation from the Press Gallery's board, revoked the memberships of 18 party-employed members. The stated rationale was a principled concern that party staff, whose inclusion was described as a legacy of the former party-press era, should not, even in principle, be able to influence the association's internal governance and privileged access arrangements.

== See also ==
- Folketing
- Rigsdagen
- Press Gallery
