= Leo Shane III =

American journalist

Leo Shane III is an American journalist. He is the Capitol Hill and White House bureau chief for Military Times, covering military personnel and veterans' issues.

A 1998 graduate of the University of Delaware, Shane in 2009 shared the George Polk Award for military reporting for coverage in Stars and Stripes exposing the military's practice of profiling journalists in Afghanistan in an attempt to steer coverage of the war.

He served as chairman of the Executive Committee of Periodical Correspondents for the 116th Congress, and, as of 2021, holds the same position for the 117th Congress.
