= Army Times =

American newspaper

- Army Times cover 10 April 2017
- Type: Newspaper
- Format: Tabloid
- Owner: Sightline Media Group
- Publisher: Michael Reinstein
- Founded: 1940
- Headquarters: 6883 Commercial Drive, Springfield, Virginia, 22159, U.S.
- Circulation: 92,801 (June 2013)
- ISSN: 0004-2595
- OCLC number: 1097094871
- Website: armytimes.com

Army Times (ISSN 0004–2595) is an American newspaper published 26 times a year serving active, reserve, national guard and retired United States Army personnel and their families, providing news, information and analysis as well as community and lifestyle features, educational supplements, and resource guides.

Army Times is published by Sightline Media Group which was formerly called the Gannett Government Media Corporation, and was once a part of Gannett Company (NYSE:GCI) and TEGNA. Gannett Government Media Corporation, formerly known as Army Times Publishing Company, was purchased by Gannett in 1997 from the Times Journal Company. Tegna sold the business to Los Angeles-based Regent in March 2016.

Military Times newspapers are the most purchased publications in Army and Air Force Exchange Service (AAFES) shops and defense commissaries, beating such national bestsellers as People and Time.

== History ==
Army Times founder Mel Ryder, began his newspaper career on the staff of Stars and Stripes selling and delivering papers to the troops on the front lines during World War I. In 1921 he joined Willard Kiplinger in forming the newsletter service, the Kiplinger Agency. He sold his interest in the agency in 1933 and began publishing Happy Days, a paper written for members of the Civilian Conservation Corps. His first order was for 400 copies and the first advertiser was GEICO. Next, Ryder started the publication of Army Times. The first issue was published in 1940 and the company was incorporated the same year.

In 2006, the publication published an editorial calling for the resignation of Donald Rumsfeld.

== Personnel ==
Current employees include:

- Mike Gruss, executive editor
- Kent Miller, senior managing editor; Air Force Times and Navy Times editor
- Andrea Scott, Marine Corps Times editor
- Leo Shane III, Capitol Hill bureau chief
- Davis Winkie, Senior Army Reporter
- Todd South, editor

== Military Times Service Member of the Year ==
Each year Military Times honors an "Everyday Hero". Someone with whom you are proud to serve. Someone whose dedication, professionalism and concern for fellow service members and community set a standard for all of us. There is a Marine of the year, Soldier of the year, Sailor of the year, Airman of the year and Coast Guardsman of the year. Each service member is nominated by their peers for Military Times selection. The winners are honored at a formal ceremony on Capitol Hill, in Washington, D.C.

== See also ==
- Air Force Times
- Marine Corps Times
- Navy Times
