= Ian M. Easton =

American scholar on international relations

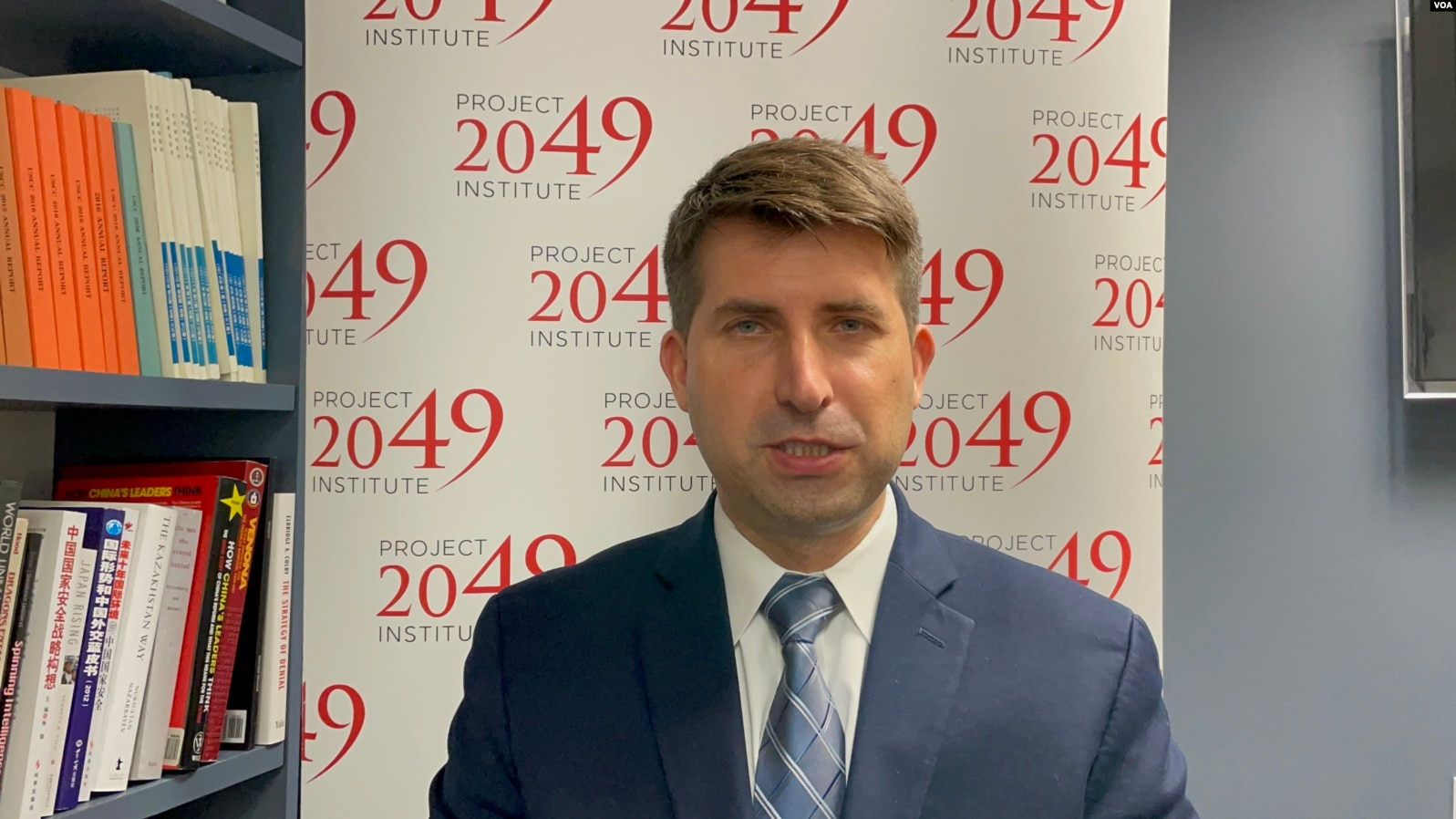
- Ian M. Easton in 2022
- Other name: 易思安
- Education: University of Illinois Urbana-Champaign(B. A.} National Chengchi University(M. A.)
- Occupations: Security analyst, China specialist
- Employer: US Naval War College

Ian M. Easton is an American security policy analyst currently serving as an associate professor at the U.S. Naval War College's China Maritime Studies Institute. He formerly was a senior director and research fellow at the Project 2049 Institute.

== Education ==
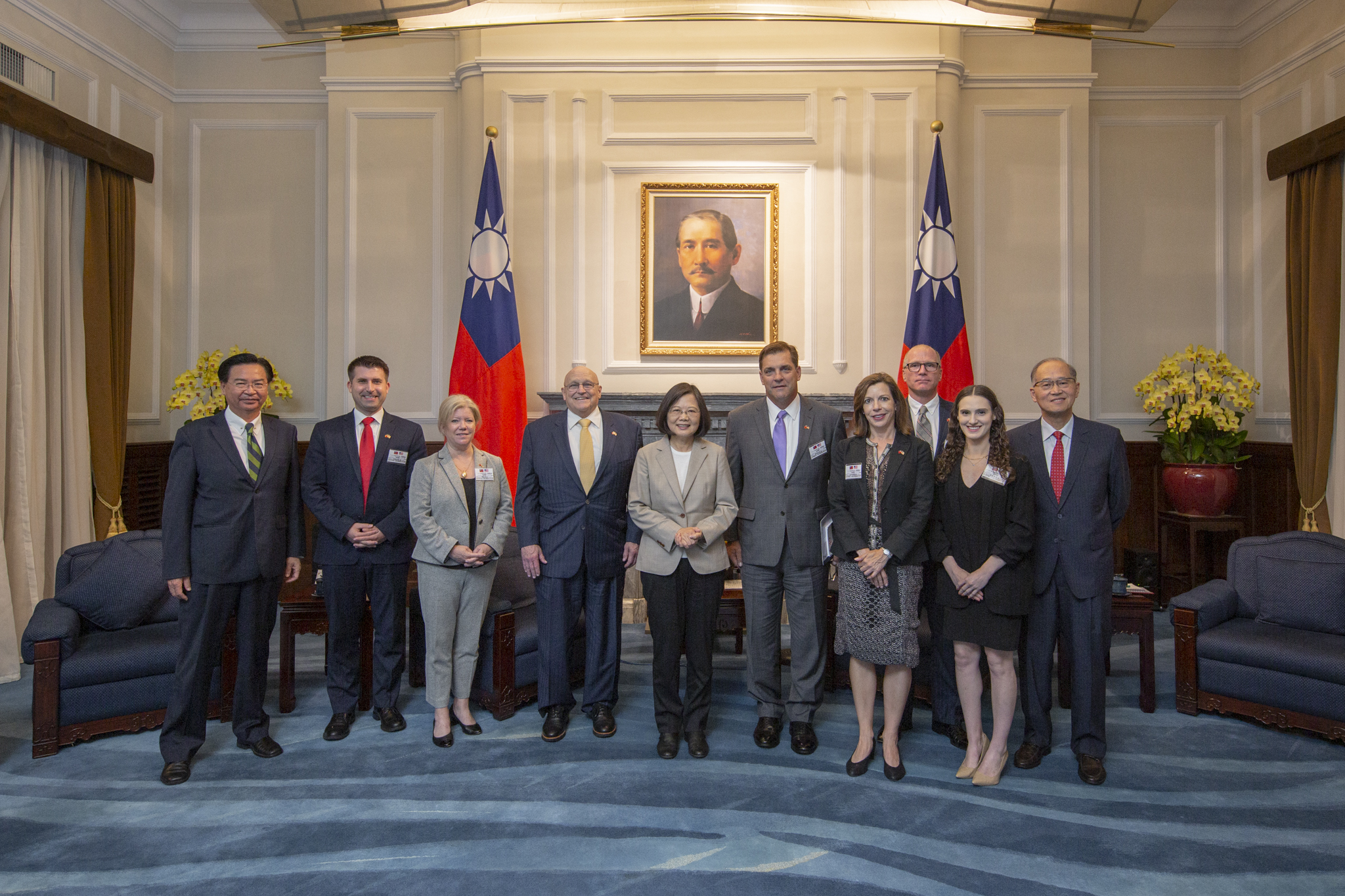
Ian Easton (2nd from left), along with members of delegation from the Project 2049 Institute, visited Office of the President in Taipei, Taiwan on June 12, 2019.

Easton holds a BA in international studies from the University of Illinois Urbana-Champaign and a MA from the International Master's Program in Mainland China Studies (IMCS) of National Chengchi University(NCCU). His thesis was titled "China's Militarization of Space: Motivations and Implications for U.S-Chinese Relations”. He holds a certificate in advanced Mandarin Chinese, having formally studied the language at National Taiwan Normal University(NTNU) in Taipei and Fudan University in Shanghai.

== Career ==
Easton lived in Taiwan and China for five years, worked as a translator for Island Technologies Inc. and the Foundation for Asia-Pacific Peace Studies (亞太和平研究基金會) in Taipei, conducting research with the Asia Bureau Chief of Defense News there. He lectured at the U.S. Naval War College and National Defense Academy of Japan and worked as a China analyst at the Center for Naval Analyses. During summer 2013, he was a visiting fellow at the Japan Institute of International Affairs in Tokyo. At the Project 2049 Institute, his research focused on quadrilateral defense and security issues involving the U.S., China, Japan, and Taiwan.

== Publications ==
=== Books ===
- Easton, Ian (2019). The Chinese Invasion Threat: Taiwan's Defense and American Strategy in Asia. Eastbridge Books. p. 428. ISBN 978-1-78869-176-5. OCLC 1102635997.
- Easton, Ian (2022). The Final Struggle: Inside China's Global Strategy. Eastbridge Books. p. 368. ISBN 978-1-78869-275-5. OCLC 1331578944.
