= Two-and-a-half front war =

Indian military concept

- Part of Military strategy
Location	Primarily India (security planning and strategic discourse)
Status	Hypothetical strategic scenario (doctrinal/analytical term)

Two-and-a-half front war, also written as 2.5 front war, is a term used in Indian strategic and defence discourse for a worst-case scenario in which the Republic of India faces concurrent pressure from two external military fronts while also dealing with a significant internal security challenge. In common usage, the “two fronts” refer to conventional threats involving China and Pakistan, while the “half front” refers to internal conflict such as insurgency and terrorism that could absorb forces and complicate mobilisation during a major crisis.

== Background ==
The expression gained prominence in public discussion after statements attributed to senior Indian military leadership, including then Chief of Army Staff General Bipin Rawat in 2017, describing readiness to meet external and internal threats together. Analysts and commentators have since used the phrase as shorthand for a combined conventional-and-subconventional contingency that stresses logistics, reserves, and inter-service coordination beyond a standard two-theatre plan.

Strategically, the idea is related to (but distinct from) a classic two-front war concept: it assumes that the internal security burden is not merely background “peacetime” policing, but a continuing operational commitment that can function like an additional front by tying down manpower, intelligence assets, and airlift while creating vulnerabilities in lines of communication and governance. Some Indian policy papers discuss this “half front” as largely associated with externally sponsored terrorism or proxy activity, and argue that internal stabilisation is a prerequisite for credible deterrence in a collusive external contingency.

The term is often used in debates about force structure and readiness—particularly ammunition and equipment stocks, theatre prioritisation, and the ability to shift formations between sectors under time pressure—because a simultaneous external challenge can reduce the margin for reallocation when internal violence escalates or when counterinsurgency commitments are already high. Critiques of the concept focus on whether aggregating fundamentally different threat types into a single “front” metaphor can obscure distinct legal, political, and operational responsibilities—especially where internal security is primarily managed by civilian authorities and police forces rather than the military. Others treat it as an intentionally conservative planning construct (a “worst case”) useful for contingency planning, while questioning how likely full external collusion plus severe internal escalation is in practice. Some commentators have improvised the phrase to "three-front war" in the possibility of Bangladesh being hostile.

== See also ==
- Two-front war
- Hybrid warfare
- Asymmetric warfare
- Counterinsurgency
