= March On: A Veterans Travel Guide =

Military history travels guide

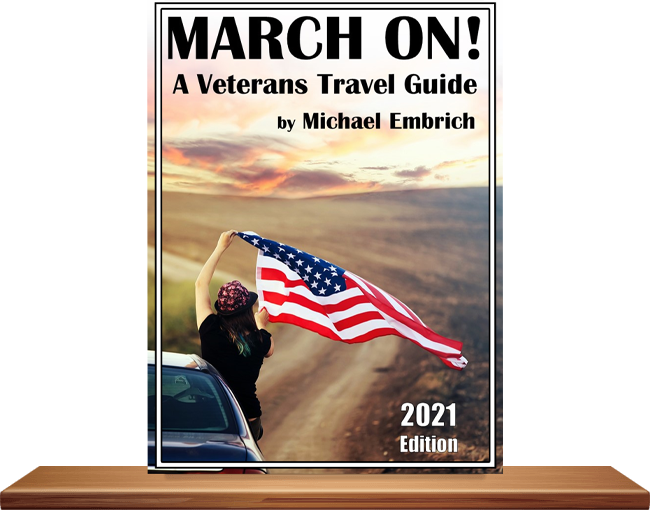
March On: A Veterans Travel Guide

March On: A Veterans Travel Guide is a military transition guide and military-veterans historical narrative by Michael Embrich published by Cannon Publishing. The book garnered acclaim from the military-veterans community, and was a best-seller on Amazon for five weeks.
