= Defense News =

American newspaper

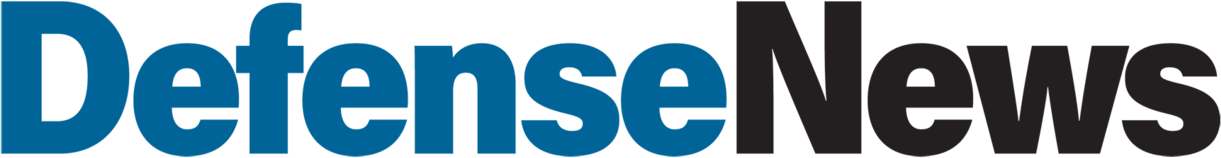

- Cover of Defense News from April 3, 2017
- Type: Weekly (news)
- Format: Tabloid
- Owner: Sightline Media Group
- Publisher: Michael Reinstein
- Editor-in-chief: J.D. Simkins
- Founded: 1986
- Language: English
- Headquarters: Tysons, Virginia, U.S.
- ISSN: 0884-139X
- Website: defensenews.com

Defense News is an American website and newspaper about the politics, business, and technology of national security published by Sightline Media Group. Founded in 1986, Defense News says it serves an audience of senior military, government, and industry decision-makers throughout the world.

== History ==
Defense News was founded as a weekly newspaper by Army Times Publishing Company. ATPCO was sold in 1997 to Gannett Company (later renamed TEGNA), which sold it to Los Angeles–based private equity firm Regent in 2016, which renamed it Sightline Media Group.

== Television ==
Defense News has a weekly television show about international defense and military issues. It first aired March 2, 2008, as This Week in Defense News with Vago Muradian on WUSA 9, a Washington, D.C., CBS affiliate. It later aired on ABC 7 WJLA and the Armed Forces Network. In April 2017, the show relaunched on WETA-TV as Defense News Weekly.

== See also ==
- Ian M. Easton
