= Federal Times =

American magazine

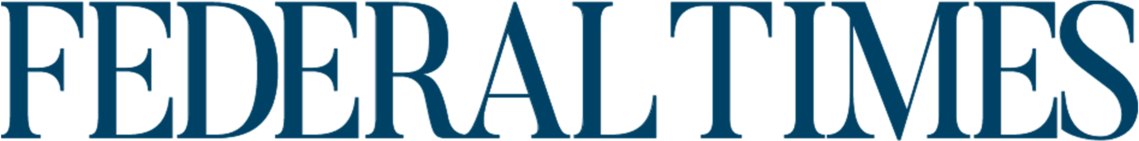
- Type: Bimonthly magazine
- Format: Magazine
- Owner: Sightline Media Group
- Publisher: Michael Reinstein
- Editor: Amber Corrin
- Managing editor: Lindsey Wray
- Founded: 1965
- Language: English
- Headquarters: Tysons, Virginia
- ISSN: 0014-9233
- OCLC number: 1569042
- Website: federaltimes.com

Federal Times is a source of information for senior U.S. government managers on trends and issues facing them in their job performance and career. The magazine is published six times per year. Federal Times is part of Sightline Media Group, which was once a part of the Gannett Company (NYSE:GCI) and is now owned by Regent. The magazine is based in Tysons, Virginia. Sightline Media Group was sold to Los Angeles-based private equity firm Regent in 2016 by Tegna Inc.
