= Escada =

German luxury fashion house

Escada SE
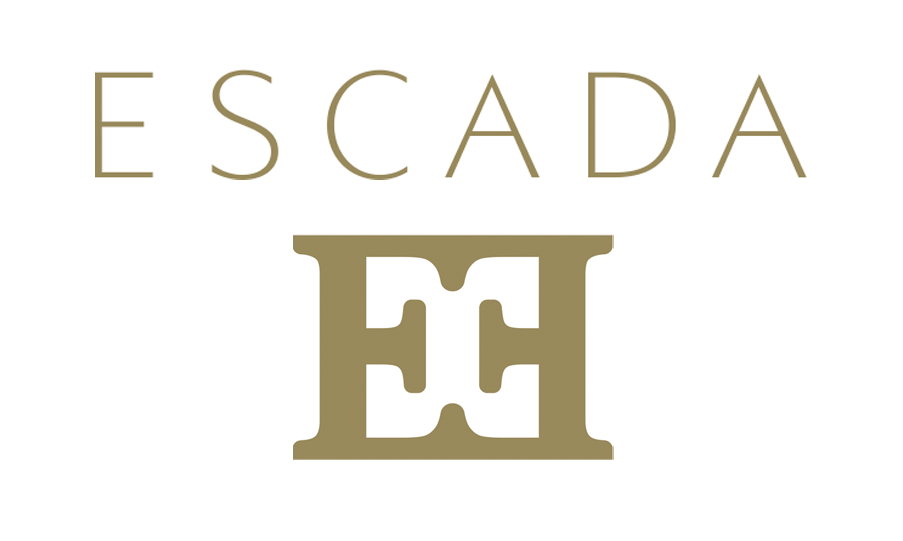

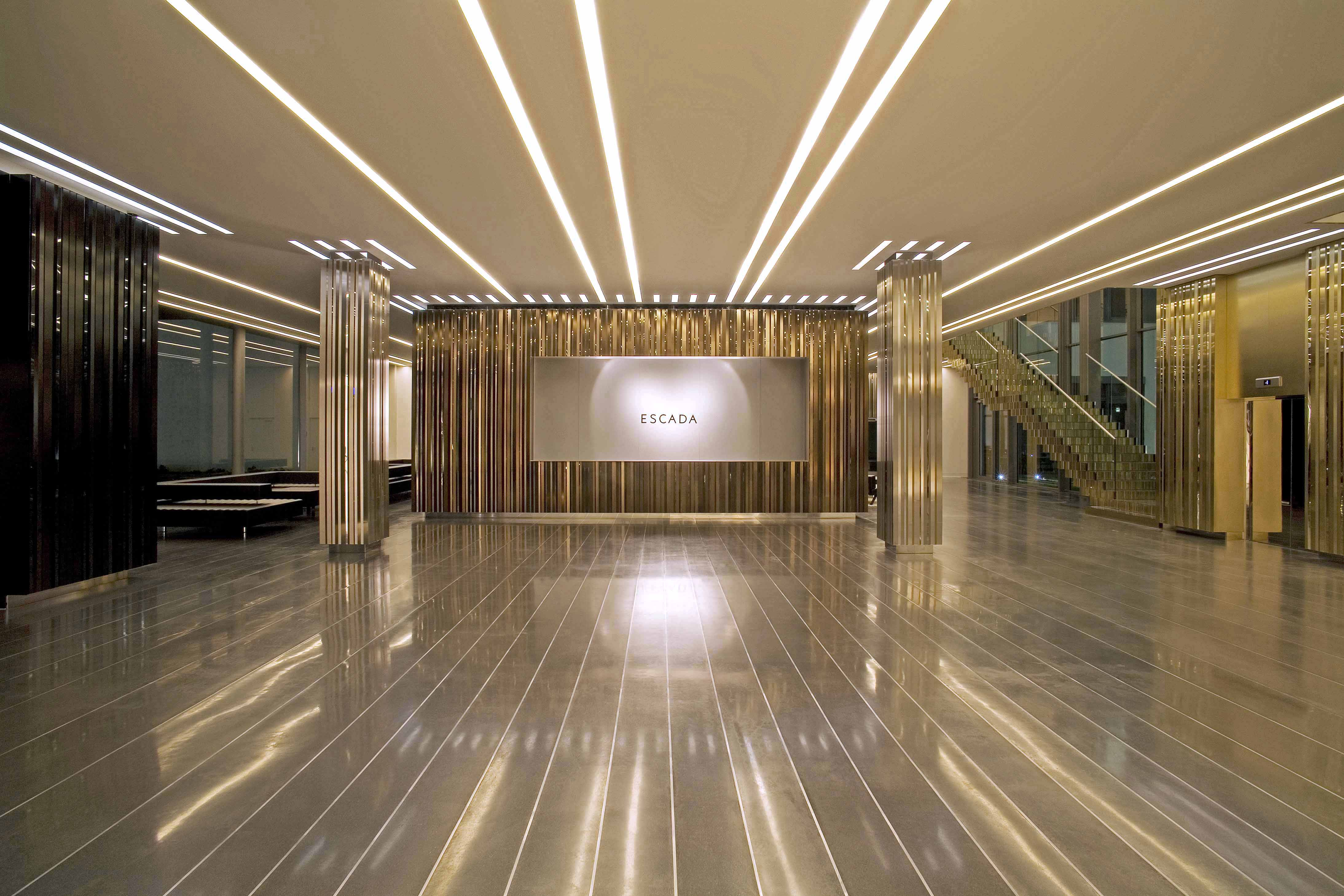
- Headquarters in Aschheim, Germany
- Type: Private
- Industry: clothing industry
- Founded: 1978
- Founders: Margaretha Ley; Wolfgang Ley
- Headquarters: Munich, Germany
- Key people: Michael Reinstein (Chairman)
- Products: Women's Fashion; Handbags; Shoes; Fragrances; Eyewear
- Owner: Regent, L.P.
- Website: escada.com

Escada SE is a luxury women's designer clothing company headquartered in Aschheim, Germany. The firm is owned by Regent, L.P., an international private equity firm led by investor Michael Reinstein.

The company was founded in 1978 by designer Margaretha Ley. It currently retails fashion accessories and ready-to-wear. As of 2017, Escada SE operates in 80 countries with 600 points of sale worldwide. The luxury fashion label employs around 1,500 employees with international locations in Milan, Paris, Tokyo, London, Beverly Hills, and New York City.

== History ==
Escada was founded in 1978 by Margaretha and Wolfgang Ley in Munich, Germany. Being a former model and having a solid education in tailoring from the Royal Court in Stockholm, Margaretha Ley became known for her bold, feminine designs. The Escada womenswear collection, which featured exquisite inlays and appliqués, was first presented in 1978. The company soon stood out with its distinctive creations featuring unusual combinations of colors and patterns, exclusive embroidery, and elaborately designed knitted fashions. Escada saw a rapid upswing and continually extended its collections and its creative work.

In the course of its international expansion, Escada SE went public in 1986, with the Leys retaining 51 percent of the voting stock. In addition to the Escada label, the company also manufactured women's clothing under the Crisca, Laurèl, Apriori and Natalie Acatrini labels, produced the Cerruti 1881 women's collection under a licensing agreement and owned a majority percentage of St. John Knits (from 1990) and Badgley Mischka (from 1992). Escada introduced its first signature scent in 1990.

After Margareth Ley died in 1992, Michael Stolzenburg (1992–1994) and Todd Oldham (1995–1997) were the brand's design directors. In 1993, the company sold its share in St. John Knits. In 1995, the company launched the Escada Sport label, established its own accessories collection including bags and shoes and granted major licenses, collaborating with such partners as Procter & Gamble. In 2001, the first Escada lingerie collection was produced and distributed by Hanro of Switzerland. With the exception of Escada Sport, the company discontinued all of its sub-lines in 2001, such as Escada Weekend or Escada Couture, focusing instead on the Escada main brand. After 12 years in the category, Escada exited the beauty business in 2002 by selling its assets and licensing its name to Wella; in turn, Wella signed a long-term, worldwide licensing agreement with Escada for the manufacturing and marketing of fragrances and cosmetics.

In 2006, Damiano Biella joined Escada 2006 in the new position of creative director. In 2007, the artist Stefan Szczesny created a new collection in Saint-Tropez, France.

From 2008, Bruno Sälzer was Escada's CEO with responsibilities for design, marketing, and sales. Under his leadership, the company sold its Münster-based subsidiary Primera AG, which comprised the brands apriori, cavita, and Laurèl, as well as BiBA to financial investor Mutares. Shortly after, it launched an unsuccessful plan to raise 29 million euros ($41 million) in a rights issue as part of a plan to restructure its debts.

On 11 August 2009, Escada filed for insolvency at Munich Local Court, as an exchange offer for the outstanding bonds of 200 million euros was not accepted by the necessary 80% of all bond holders. Sven Ley, the son of founder Wolfgang Ley, teamed up with the former head of Gucci, Giacomo Santucci, and Italian investment group Borletti to offer almost 80 million euros ($118.2 million) for Escada. In November 2009, the company was eventually acquired by India's London-based billionaire Lakshmi Mittal, whose daughter-in-law, Megha Mittal, emerged as the new owner and became chair of the company's board.

Following the sale, Bettina Hammerl (2009–2012) and Daniel Wingate (2012–2017) oversaw Escada's fashion design. Sälzer stepped down as CEO by December 2014 and was succeeded by Glenn McMahon.

From 2016 until 2019, Iris Epple-Righi served as Escada's CEO. During her time in office, Niall Sloan joined the company as the Global Design Director in 2017. Sloan presented his first runway collection for Escada at New York Fashion Week for Spring/Summer 19 to celebrate the company's 40th anniversary. The event was held at the historic Park Avenue Armory. For the Fall / Winter 19 season Sloan presented his next collection, inspired by the life and legacy of Hedy Lamarr, during Paris Fashion Week in February at the Institut de France.

Escada announced British singer Rita Ora as the brand's face of their spring campaign in 2019. Ora released a version of the ESCADA Heart Bag which she helped design and a portion of proceeds from the sale of the design was given to Women for Women International.

Mittal sold Escada in October 2019 to Regent, L.P. a global private equity firm in Beverly Hills, California. By September 2020, the company again filed for insolvency, with plans to limit corporate operations in the country and further limit its retail presence.

== Corporate affairs ==
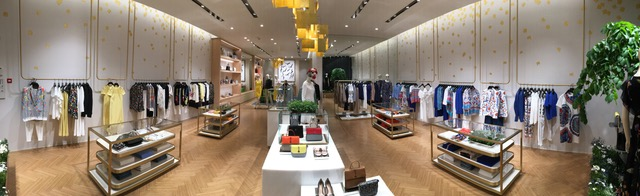
ESCADA store panorama inside

Escada divides its business activities in three segments:

- Fashion with the brands Escada Mainline and Escada Sport.
- Accessories consisting of bags, shoes, and small leather goods.
- Licenses which utilizes the Escada brand for fragrances, eyewear.

== Notable clients ==
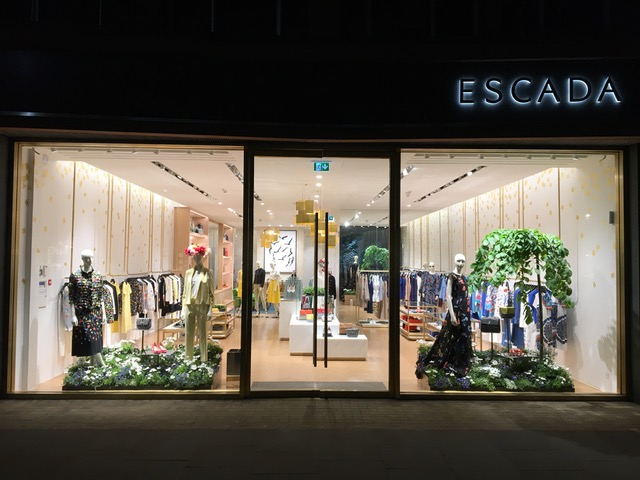
ESCADA Store front

Diana, Princess of Wales was a customer of Escada, famously wearing an Escada coat for a formal visit to Berlin in 1987. Kim Basinger was awarded the Oscar in 1998 in an Escada gown. Crown Princess Victoria of Sweden is a regular Escada customer. In 2010, she wore Escada to the pre-wedding party at the wedding of Prince Nikolaos of Greece. In 2011, she wore Escada to the Monaco royal wedding, the pre-wedding dinner for the British royal wedding, as well as the state visit to Germany. Sarah, Duchess of York, wore Escada to Elton John's White Tie and Tiara Ball in 2011.

== Controversy ==
In a 1994 lawsuit filed in New York State Supreme Court, former Escada Beauté president Lawrence H. Appel claimed he was fired without cause, less than three weeks after the company offered and then withdraw a "buyout" proposal. Appel also alleged that Wolfgang Ley, who was named as a defendant, made numerous "derogatory comments" about Jews.

On 18 October 2007, the group "Global Network Against the Fur Industry", which is made up of organizations such as Coalition to Abolish the Fur Trade or Offensive gegen die Pelzindustrie, launched a campaign against Escada, in the form of a day of action, in hopes of getting Escada to stop selling fur. According to their website, on 18 October, there were 40 actions against Escada in 14 countries. On 6 October 2007, Escada headquarters were vandalized by the Animal Liberation Front. Since that date the campaign against Escada continues with regular pickets in front of Escada outlets worldwide. In October 2010, the company confirmed to the campaigners that Escada would go completely fur-free by 2011.
