= Michael Reinstein =

American businessman, lawyer and private equity executive

Michael A. Reinstein
- Born: Los Angeles, California, U.S.
- Education: University of Southern California
- Occupations: Private Equity Investor, Publisher
- Known for: Chairman, Regent, L.P.

Michael A. Reinstein (born September 26, 1971) is an American private equity businessman, and the founder and chairman of Regent, a global private equity firm.

== Early life ==
Michael Reinstein was born on September 26, 1971 in Los Angeles, California. He attended Southern Methodist University and graduated from the University of Southern California and Pepperdine University School of Law. He is a member of the State Bar of California.

== Career ==
Reinstein is the founder and chairman of Regent, a private equity firm. Reinstein started his career as an intern under former President Ronald Reagan and later worked at ICM Partners. He is currently the chairman of several Regent businesses, including Escada, La Senza, Sassoon, Regis Salons, Supercuts UK, Lillian Vernon and Sightline Media Group. He also serves as the Publisher of Regent's various newspaper, magazine, and media properties, including Sunset Magazine, Defense News, Army Times, Navy Times, Air Force Times, Marine Corps Times, Armed Forces Journal, and Federal Times among others. He was the chief executive officer of The Franklin Mint as well as CEO of CinemaNow.

Reinstein is also the founder of the Military Charity Organization, a Washington D.C.–based non-profit that operates the Service Members of the Year Honors Program. He has been on private and public company boards including Pegasus Solutions, and NexTag, as well as the Australian Stock Exchange listed technology company Structural Monitoring Systems.
