= Regent LP =

American private equity firm

Regent, L.P.
- Type: Private
- Industry: Private equity
- Founded: 2013; 13 years ago
- Founder: Michael Reinstein
- Headquarters: Beverly Hills, California, United States
- Products: Investments, private equity funds, leveraged buyouts
- Website: regentlp.com

Regent, L.P. is an American private equity firm based in Beverly Hills, California. Many of Regent's investments have been in software, technology, consumer products, retail, and media. Its founder and chairman is Michael Reinstein.

== History ==
Regent's first acquisition was in 2013, when the firm acquired the Rovi Entertainment Store over-the-top video platform from Rovi Corporation with an Austin, Texas–based investor. The firm later purchased the CinemaNow video business from Best Buy. Regent and its partners sold these businesses to FilmOn in 2016.

- September 2013: Regent's partners acquired control of Skinit, a San Diego–based e-commerce company from private equity firm Ares Management.
- September 2014: Regent acquired Halco Rock Tools from Caterpillar Inc.
- October 2014: Acquired travel technology provider Pegasus Solutions in a deal that sold Pegasus' distribution-services business to HIG Capital.
- March 2015: Acquired Silicon Valley technology company NexTag from a consortium of investors led by Deutsche Bank.
- October 2015: Bought the catalog and e-commerce company Lillian Vernon Corporation and mail order business Current, Inc. from Minnesota- based Taylor Corporation. Regent's holdings also include magazine publisher HistoryNet.
- 2016: Bought from Tegna the military and defense publishing company Sightline Media Group, which publishes Defense News, Army Times, Navy Times, Air Force Times and Federal Times.
- IOctober 2017: Purchased the luxury salon division of Regis Corporation, whose brands included Regis, MasterCuts, Hennessey, and Carlton Hair in North America and the Regis and SuperCuts brands in Europe.
- November 30, 2017: Time Inc. announced the sale of the Sunset brand to Regent LP. Sunset was founded in 1898 and has an audience of 6.5 million across its digital, print and social platforms.
- January 2019: L Brands, parent company of Victoria's Secret, sold lingerie and sleepwear retailer La Senza to Regent.
- February 2019: Regent purchased Plainville Farms food business from American food company Hain Celestial Group.
- August 2019: Regent purchased the Diamondback Bicycles and Redline Bicycles brands as well as several other cycling businesses from Netherlands-based bicycle company Accell.
- November 2019: Regent purchased the Escada fashion house from the Mittal family, which had Megha Mittal serving as chairperson.
- May 2021: Ralph Lauren Corporation announced it would sell its Club Monaco brand to Regent LP.
- August 2024: Regent acquired Swiss luxury leather goods and clothing label Bally from German conglomerate JAB Holding Company.
- March 2025: Regent acquired Foundry, the owner of technology publications such as PC World, Macworld, and InfoWorld, from International Data Group and acquired TechCrunch from Yahoo!.
- September 2025, Natura announced that it would sell Avon International to Regent LP. The sale excluded Avon operations in Latin America and Russia, which Natura retained.
- August 24, 2026, Avon International, through its parent company Regent LP, announced that it would acquire Avon North America from LG H&H. The acquisition reunited Avon North America and Avon International under common ownership for the first time since 2016.
