= Sightline Media Group =

American publishing company

- Parent company: Archetype (Regent, L.P.)
- Predecessor: Gannett Government Media
- Founded: 1940
- Country of origin: United States
- Headquarters location: Tysons, Virginia, U.S.
- Publication types: Newspapers, magazines
- Imprints: Defense News Media Group
- No. of employees: 180
- Official website: sightlinemediagroup.com

Sightline Media Group, formerly Gannett Government Media and Army Times Publishing Company, is a United States company that publishes newspapers, magazines, websites, and other publications about the U.S. and other militaries.

The company's Military Times group publishes four bimonthly newspapers aimed at current and former U.S. military personnel: Army Times (founded 1940), Navy Times (founded 1951), Air Force Times (founded 1947), and Marine Corps Times (founded 1999). It also publishes Defense News (founded 1986), C4ISRNET, and Federal Times.

Its defunct publications include Armed Forces Journal, founded in 1863, which was the nation's longest-running defense-themed publication until it ceased publication in 2014.

== History ==
The company was founded in 1940 as the Army Times Publishing Company.

In August 1997, it was purchased by Gannett.

As part of the spinoff of digital and broadcasting properties in 2015, Gannett spun off these properties to Tegna. In March 2016, Tegna sold Sightline Media Group to Regent, a Los Angeles-based private equity firm controlled by investor Michael Reinstein. Regent formed the publisher Archetype in 2019 for its media holdings.

In 2011, hackers breached a Sightline database of subscribers, obtaining their names, passwords, email addresses, duty status, paygrade, and branch of service.
