= Wage union =

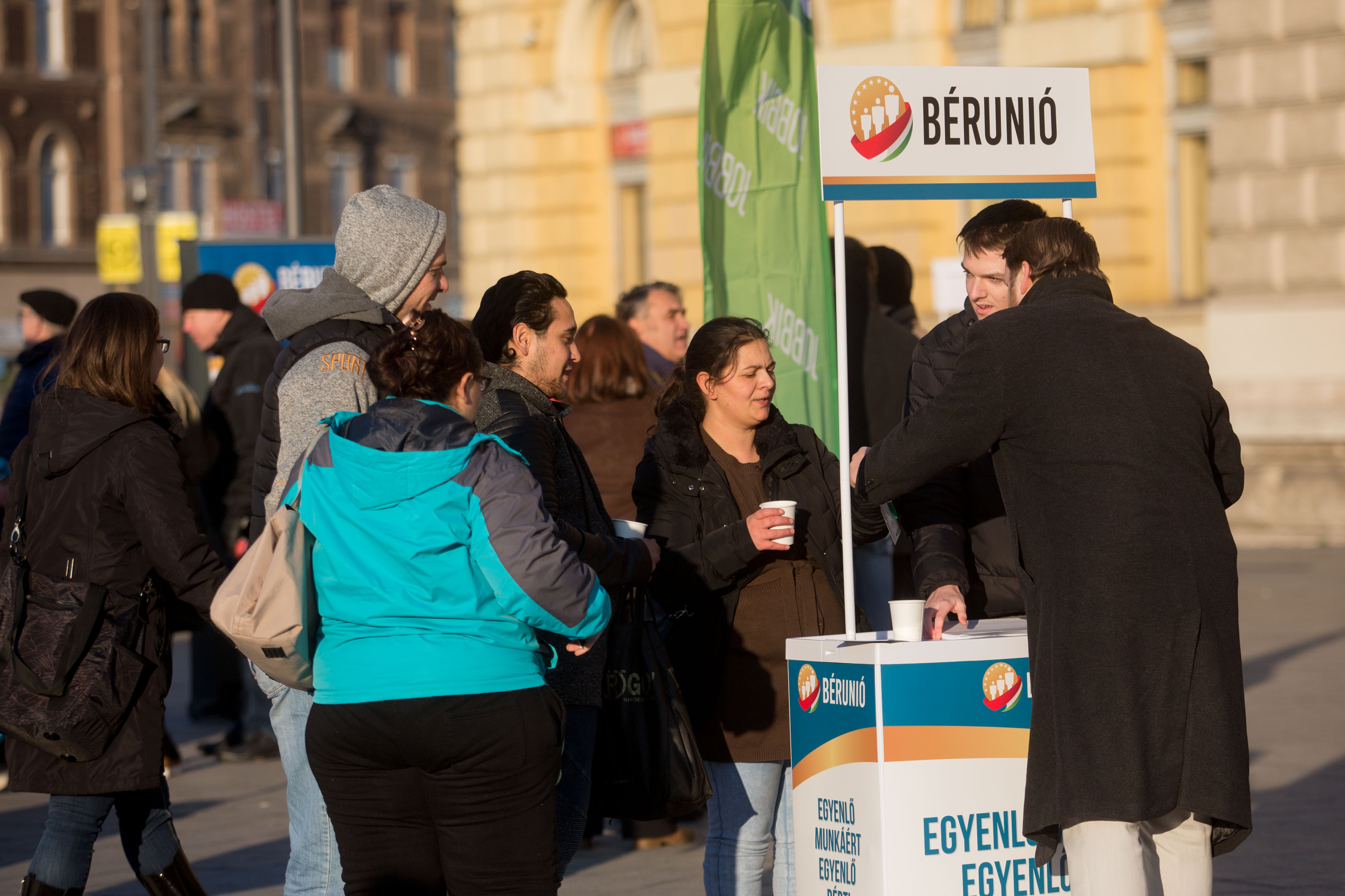
Wage Union activists are collecting signatures for the Wage Union in Budapest (2017)

The Wage Union is a European Citizens’ Initiative launched by Central European political parties, trade unions and private individuals, aiming to eliminate the economic and wage inequalities between the EU's western and eastern (those joined after 2004) member states.

After Portuguese trade union USI had joined the initiative, original scope of eliminating inequalities between the eastern and western part of the EU has been broadened to a more general approach. According to the new declaration of Wage Union, the main goal of the initiative is to eliminate inequalities among core states and peripheral states of the European Union.

== The history of the Wage Union initiative ==
At a Budapest conference organized by Jobbik Movement for a Better Hungary on 14 March 2017, the representatives of eight central European countries formed the Citizens’ Committee for the initiative, thus officially launching the project. Hungary's Márton Gyöngyösi as elected as he representative of the Citizens’ Committee while Jaak Madison of Estonia was entrusted as thesubstitute representative.

On 16 May 2017, the European Commission partially registered and approved of the initiative.

As the original intention of the founders was to make Wage Union an acceptable initiative for all European citizens regardless of political views or party affiliation in September 2017 a Trade Unions’ Committee was formed in Budapest. The National Trade Union of Hungary (Nemzeti Szakszervezet) took the role of the leading organization of the Committee.

=== Conference in the European Parliament ===
On 27 November 2017 founders of the initiative participated on an international conference, entitled "Equal pay for equal work" organized by MEP Zoltán Balczó in the European Parliament. The conference was attended as panelist by representative of the Wage Union MP Márton Gyöngyösi, European Green Party MEP Tamás Meszerics; Monika Ladmanova, Advisor to the Commissioner for Justice, Consumers and Gender Equality; Przemyslaw Worek, vice-chair of the Polish Solidarnosc 80 trade union; Paolo Marcos, head of the Portuguese Union of Independent Trade Unions (USI); Zbigniew Krysiak. adjunct professor of the Warsaw School of Economics; Liene Dobele, director in EY Europe, Middle East, India and Africa region for Public Policy and Péter Róna, economist and University of Oxford fellow.

== Members of the Citizens’ Committee for the Wage Union initiative ==
Country	Representative	Organisation
Hungary	Márton Gyöngyösi	Jobbik
Estonia	Jaak Madison	Conservative People's Party of Estonia
Latvia	Konstantīns Pupurs	private individual
Poland	Paweł Gawluk	Solidarity80
Slovakia	Péter Pallér	private individual
Romania	Dragos Tirnoveanu	private individual
Croatia	Frano Čirko	GO!
Bulgaria	Mihail Petrov	VMRO

=== Members that joined the initiative after registration ===
- Portugal - Paulo Alexandre Gonçalves Marcos - USI
- Slovenia - Andrej Čuš - Greens of Slovenia

== The objectives of the initiative ==
The initiative aims to call public attention to the economic and wage gaps between the core and theperipheral member states of the European Union as well as the elimination thereof. The initiators’ goal is to lay out the principle of "equal wages for equal work" in the EU Treaties as a fundamental right for citizens. They consider it as an essential condition for integration. "Ever since 2004, the EU's eastern enlargement has failed to enable Eastern Central European member states to catch up with their western counterparts. The enormous gap between the wages is a grave injustice that drives valuable labour force to the west and thus puts the eastern region into an unmanageable situation. The only way to remedy this discrepancy is to ensure that the European community sets the elimination of wage inequalities as its fundamental principle which is then implemented in the foreseeable future. However, neither member state leaders nor EU institutions have decided to champion this cause. It is time that the disadvantaged member states, with the support of their citizens, put this issue on the agenda of European political discourse. We can assuredly say that the proposal is of historic significance. " – quote from the official website of the initiative.

According to the New Declaration of Wage Union "While various forums conduct daily debates on immigration into the core European countries, such issues as the emigration from the periphery and the labour drain from these regions are hardly addressed at all even though these phenomena affect a large number of people and cause very severe problems. For our nations, these problems mean a demographic deficit, a huge social security risk, an increasing labour shortage, an unmanageable loss of income, the loss of taxpayers’ money invested in human resources as well as a social disaster where families are torn apart, parents are separated from their children and grandchildren grow up without their grandparents. It is a tragic situation. It is just as tragic as the silence about this issue."

== Public support to the Wage Union ==
Wage Union gained support from several intellectuals, like Péter Róna, liberal economist, Frederic Petit, member of the French Parliament, István Teplán economic historian and founder of the Central European University or Zbigniew Krysiak, director of Schuman Thought Institute.

== Criticism ==
Critics of the Wage Union initiative have said that wage inequalities cannot be eliminated as the reasons for the low wages in eastern member states are rooted in underlying economic factors such as lower productivity. The initiators have admitted that the accomplishment of a Wage Union is a long process which requires a systemic transformation of Central European economies, an increased productivity and the output of products with higher added value but no such intentions have even been demonstrated in the region so far. Another oft-quoted argument against the Wage Union is that western member states are not interested in its implementation. However, the backers of the project point out that the massive emigration of Central Europeans to the west leads to social tensions and upsets the stability of the European Union, which western European leaders have also begun to realize. The solution may lie in the reduction of the gap in living standards. According to certain critics of the Wage Union concept, the European Union has no institutional means to eliminate wage inequalities but the participants of the initiative claim that the first step should be to lay out the principle itself, which could then be followed by creating the institutional conditions but the problem has not even been raised so far.
