= Veličković =

Veličković (Cyrillic script: Величковић) is a Serbian patronymic surname derived from a masculine given name Veličko. Notable people with the surname include:

- Dušan Veličković (1947–2023), Serbian writer, journalist and filmmaker
- Jasna Veličković (born 1974), Serbian composer
- Marko Veličković (born 2004), Serbian footballer
- Nenad Veličković (born 1962), Bosnian prose writer and playwright
- Novica Veličković (born 1986), Serbian professional basketball player
- Vladimir Veličković (1935–2019), Serbian painter
- Vladimir Veličković (born 1989), Serbian professional basketball player
- Vukša Veličković (born 1979), Serbian writer, journalist and cultural critic
