= Carsten Q. Schneider =

German political scientist

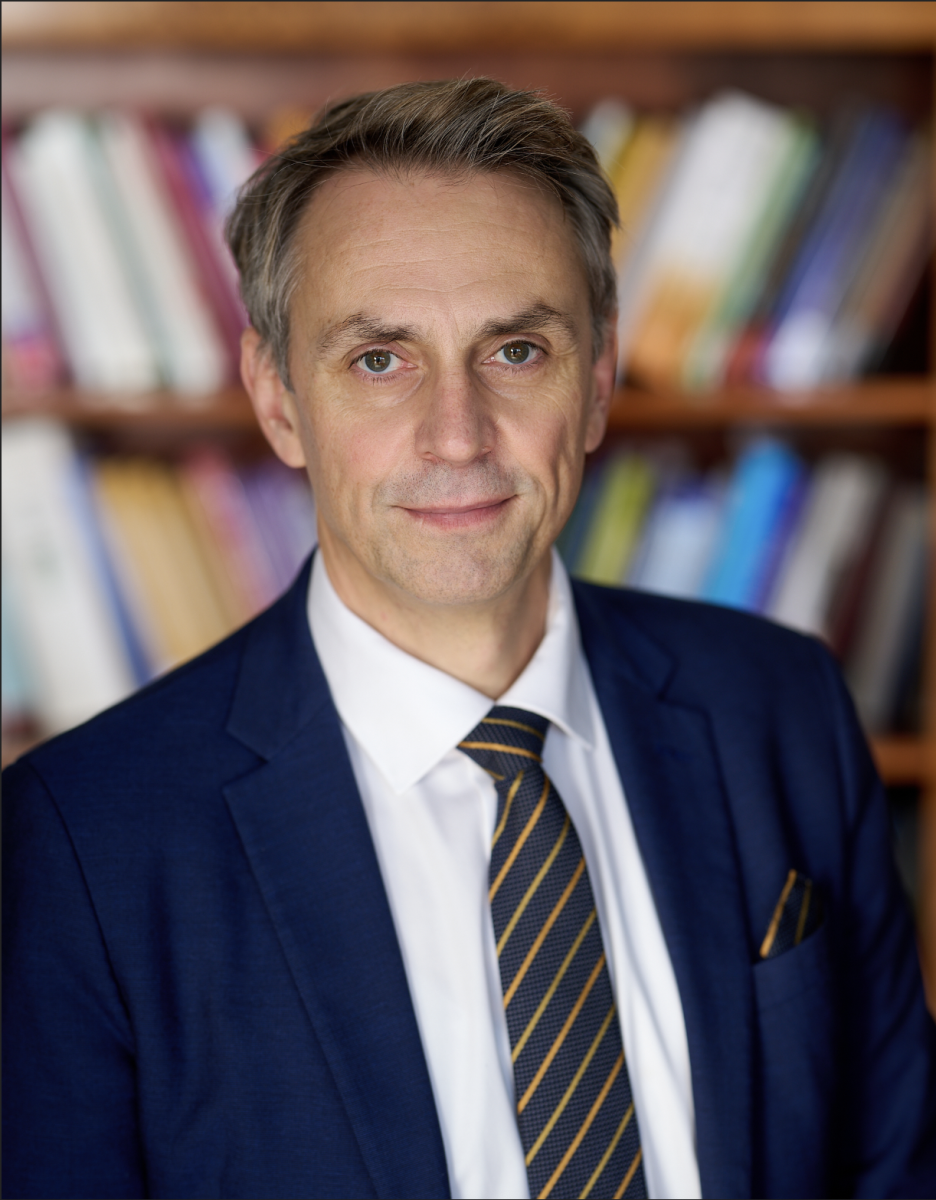
Carsten Q. Schneider

Carsten Q. Schneider (born September 16, 1972) is a German professor of political science and an author of books and journal articles on applied methods of social science research, specifically set theory and qualitative comparative analysis (QCA). He is a professor at the Department of Political Science at Central European University, a private research university based in Vienna, Austria, and currently serves as the university’s Interim President and Rector.

== Life ==
Carsten Q. Schneider was born in Germany. He earned his bachelor's degree in political science and government studies from the Marburg University and a master's degree in the same discipline from the Free University of Berlin. He later completed his doctoral research at the European University Institute (EUI) in Florence, spending time at the Social Science Center (WZB) in Berlin, University of California Berkeley, Harvard University, the New School (New York City), and Pompeu Fabra University (Barcelona), both as a PhD candidate and a visiting scholar. He speaks English, Spanish, and Italian fluently.

Carsten joined CEU in 2004 as an assistant professor in the Department of Political Science, which was at the time located in Budapest. He was later promoted to associate professor in 2008, gaining full professorship in 2015. Between 2014 and 2017, he served as the head of the Department of Political Science at CEU. He briefly worked as a director of the Master of Arts in Political Science degree before taking on the role of the Pro-Rector for External Relations (2022 - 2025) at CEU.

Carsten Q. Schneider founded the Center for the Study of Imperfections in Democracies (DISC) at CEU (2008 - 2014), which promoted interdisciplinary research in the study of democracy. He is a research affiliate at the CEU Democracy Institute.

Since 2020, Schneider has actively contributed to and participated in the The European University of Social Sciences, acting as a Co-Chair of the Permanent Design Team and leading research-focused work packages.

Following the November 2024 announcement of Shalini Randeria stepping down from her role as the sixth President and Rector of CEU, Carsten Q. Schneider was appointed the Interim President and Rector of Central European University on August 1, 2025, to manage the regular university operations during the search for the next president. Carol T. Christ, Chair of the Board of Trustees at CEU, which oversaw the appointment, stated,

"We are very grateful that Carsten Schneider has taken on this role. His deep knowledge of CEU, combined with his leadership in external relations and his commitment to our mission, make him uniquely qualified to lead us through this transition."

— Article "Carsten Q. Schneider appointed Interim President and Rector of Central European University in Vienna"

Schneider is expected to remain in the position until July 31, 2026, when the next President and Rector will take office.

== Academics ==
His research focuses on political regime changes in different regions of the world, the future of democracies and comparative politics, as well as research design and methods of conducting social science research. He authored several books on the topic, including Set-Theoretic Methods for the Social Sciences: A Guide to Qualitative Comparative Analysis (2012, co-authored with Claudius Wagemann), Set-Theoretic Multi-Method Research: A Guide to Combining QCA and Case Studies (2024), Qualitative Comparative Analysis (QCA) using R: A Beginner’s Guide (2021, co-authored with Ioana-Elena Oana and Eva Thomann), and The Consolidation of Democracy: Comparing Europe and Latin America (2008). He won the David Collier Mid-Career Achievement Award by the Qualitative and Multi-Method Research Section of the American Political Science Association (APSA) in 2019.

He regularly participates in international research conferences and holds editorial and advisory board member seats for key political science journals in Europe and America, such as European Journal of Political Research, Swiss Political Science Review, Sociological Methods and Research, and American Political Science Review. Schneider currently serves on the Cambridge University Press's editorial board for the Methods for Social Inquiry book series.

== Awards and recognitions ==
In 2009, he was awarded one of the prestigious John F. Kennedy Memorial post-doctoral fellowships for German scholars at the Minda de Gunzburg Center for European Studies at Harvard. In the same year, he was elected as one of the ten members of the German Academy of Young Scientists (Die Junge Akademie), a joint initiative by the Berlin-Brandenburg Academy of Sciences and Humanities (BBAW) and the German National Academy of Sciences Leopoldina that promotes outstanding young academics. The membership is granted for a period of five years only.

- 2019 - American Political Science Association (APSA)’ David Collier Mid-Career Achievement Award
- 2015 - SER Annual Award for the Best Paper’ published in 2014 in Socio-Economic Review, for the paper ”Forms of Welfare Capitalism and Education-Based Participatory Inequalities”, co-authored with Kristin Makzsin, in Socio-Economic Review. Vol. 12, No.2, pp. 437–62, 2014

== Books ==
- Set-Theoretic Multi-Method Research: A Guide to Combining QCA and Case Studies (2024), Cambridge University Press. ISBN 9781009307154
- Qualitative Comparative Analysis (QCA) using R: A Beginner’s Guide (2021), Cambridge University Press. ISBN 9781009006781(co-authored with Ioana-Elena Oana and Eva Thomann)
- Set-Theoretic Methods for the Social Sciences: A Guide to Qualitative Comparative Analysis (2012), Cambridge University Press. ISBN 9781139004244 (co-authored with Claudius Wagemann)
- The Consolidation of Democracy: Comparing Europe and Latin America (2008), Routledge. ISBN 9780415663939
- Qualitative Comparative Analysis (QCA) und Fuzzy Sets. Opladen: Ein Lehrbuch für Anwender und alle, die es werden wollen (2007), Verlag Barbara Budrich. ISBN 9783866490680(co-authored with Claudius Wagemann)
