= Velychko (surname) =

Velychko (Ukrainian: Величко) is a Ukrainian surname. It is the Ukrainian cognate of Velichko. Its feminine counterpart is Velychka.

Notable people with the surname include:

- Oleksiy Velychko (born 1954), Ukrainian football coach
- Samiilo Velychko (1670–after 1728), Ukrainian Cossack
- Serhiy Velychko (born 1976), Ukrainian footballer

== See also ==
- Samiilo Velychko Chronicle, 18th century Ukrainian chronicle
