= Evropa (magazine) =

Serbian magazine

- Evropa issue #145, January 18, 2007
- Editor-in-Chiefs: Željko Cvijanović (2004-06); Rade Stanić (2006-07); Dušan Veličković (2007-08)
- Categories: newsmagazine
- Frequency: weekly
- Founded: 2004
- First issue: April 15, 2004
- Final issue: February 7, 2008
- Country: Serbia
- Language: Serbian
- Website: evropa.mediaonweb.org

Evropa was a weekly Serbian magazine published from 2004 until 2008. In written form, it was occasionally also referred to as Evropa^{+}

At first, conceptually a cross between a news and general interest magazine, Evropa's first issue appeared on April 15, 2004. Initially edited and owned by Željko Cvijanović, the magazine devoted equal attention to political, social and economic issues, as well as to culture and entertainment topics. Written in lighter tone, published under "Nacionalni nedeljnik" (National weekly) mantra, it tried to avoid a single political and ideological position.

Its publisher's stated ambition was to promote European values as well as European perspective for Serbia. To that end, magazine has developed a network of correspondents in the following European capitals: Dublin, Madrid, Moscow, London, Rome, Paris as well as in the countries of former Yugoslavia.

In addition to Serbia, Evropa was available on the news stands in Montenegro, Bosnia and Herzegovina, Croatia, Slovenia, and Macedonia. During summer months the magazine was distributed throughout seaside resorts in Turkey, Bulgaria, and Greece.

In mid-2006, Cvijanović sold Evropa to Philip Zepter and the editing duties were taken over by Rade Stanić who in many ways continued with concept employed by Cvijanović.

In late August 2007, Dušan Veličković became Evropas editor-in-chief. The first issue he put together was #178 on September 6, 2007. In addition to new editor, the magazine saw major conceptual changes with Veličković's arrival. "Nacionalni nedeljnik" mantra was immediately scrapped, and a whole new staff (editors and columnists) came along to replace the old guard. They included: Igor Marojević, Nastasija Radović, Bruce Sterling, Richard Byrne, Vukša Veličković, Miša Brkić, Zanko Tomić, Bojana Mijović, and Jens-Martin Eriksen. Since December 6, 2007 (issue #191), Evropa's new credo/marketing slogan is "Prvi evropski news magazin u Srbiji" (First European newsmagazine in Serbia). Since the same issue, the magazine also got a visual makeover with dark blue replacing red as the dominant colour.

On February 14, 2008, the day its issue #201 was due to appear on news stands, deputy editor-in-chief Nastasija Radović announced the publishing of Evropa has been discontinued, which means that the issue #200 from February 7 was its last. According to her, the decision was communicated to the staff by the publishing company representatives who informed them it was due to financial reasons. Editor-in-chief Dušan Veličković added that the staff was still hoping to find a way for the magazine to keep publishing, however that has not happened.
