= CEU Business School =

Former management school in Hungary

Coordinates: 47°30′59″N 19°02′11″E

CEU Business School was a US-accredited and licensed management school in Budapest, capital of EU member Hungary. It was founded by a group including investor and philanthropist George Soros in 1988, and was the first school in Central Eastern Europe to offer graduate business education leading to an American MBA. On August 1, 2017, CEU created its new Department of Economics and Business, merging the Department of Economics and CEU Business School.

== History and Location ==
CEU Business School was founded in 1988 as International Management Center (IMC). After granting joint degrees with various US schools it became part of the also Soros-founded Central European University in 2002. Until today George Soros is closely connected with the university; amongst other things he personally hands over every Graduate's diploma. As part of CEU's campus redevelopment project the school relocated to CEU's main campus in downtown Budapest (Nador utca 9–15) in 2016 from its previous location on the Buda side of the Danube. In fall 2010 Mel Horwitch, former program director at the MIT Sloan School of Management, has been appointed CEU Business School's new Dean. Horwitch stepped down after finishing his term at the end of Academic Year 2015–16, and was replaced by Julius Horvath as Acting Dean.

== Degrees ==
The School used to offer an intense 11-month Full-time MBA, an Executive MBA (Katalyst Executive MBA) taught in a weekend-format, and together with 7 other schools, a renowned Executive MBA called International Master of Management (IMM) which is taught on multiple campuses and has (2010) been ranked #21 Executive MBA in the world by Financial Times. The Full-Time MBA is ranked #1 in Central Europe and #13 in Europe by QS Global 200 Business School Report 2012.

The MSc in IT Management program was relaunched in the autumn of 2013 and an intensive Master's in Finance program was launched in early 2014.

Through CEU's accreditation with the Hungarian authorities as well as with the American Middle States Association of Colleges and Schools, CEU Business School's degrees are recognized both in the European Union and the United States. The full-time and the part-time MBA programs are accredited by the Association of MBAs, the IMM program also by AACSB.

The previously existing Undergraduate Programs (BSc and Dual Degree in International Business with Uni Bocconi in Italy) have been discontinued as has the Executive MBA program in Romania.

The full-time MBA was discontinued from the 2017–18 academic year. A redesigned, cutting-edge Executive MBA program was launched in 2020.

== Partner Institutions ==
CEU Business School offers a number of exchange and dual degree opportunities with schools in Europe, North America, and Asia including Schulich School of Business in Toronto, and CEIBS in Shanghai.

== See also ==
- Central European University
- Central European University Executive MBA
- George Soros
