= Velichko =

Velichko or Veličko (Cyrillic script: Величко) is a South Slavic masculine given name and an East Slavic surname. It may refer to:

== Surname ==
- Olga Velichko (born 1965), Russian fencer
- Olesya Velichko (born 1981), modern pentathlete
- Samiilo Velychko (1670-1728), Ukrainian Cossack chronicler
- Vasily Velichko (1860–1903), Russian explorer and editor
- Vladimir Velichko (born 1937), served as First Deputy Premier of the Soviet Union in 1991
- Yevgeniy Velichko (born 1987), cross-country skier

== Given name ==
- Velichko Cholakov (1982–2017), ethnically Bulgarian Azerbaijani weightlifter
- Velichko Minekov (1928–2022), Bulgarian sculptor
- Velichko Velichkov (born 1986), Bulgarian football defender
- Velichko Velichkov (1934–1982), sport shooter

== See also ==
- Velichkov
- Veličković
