= Institute for Advanced Study at Central European University =

Coordinates: 47.501259°N 19.03329°E

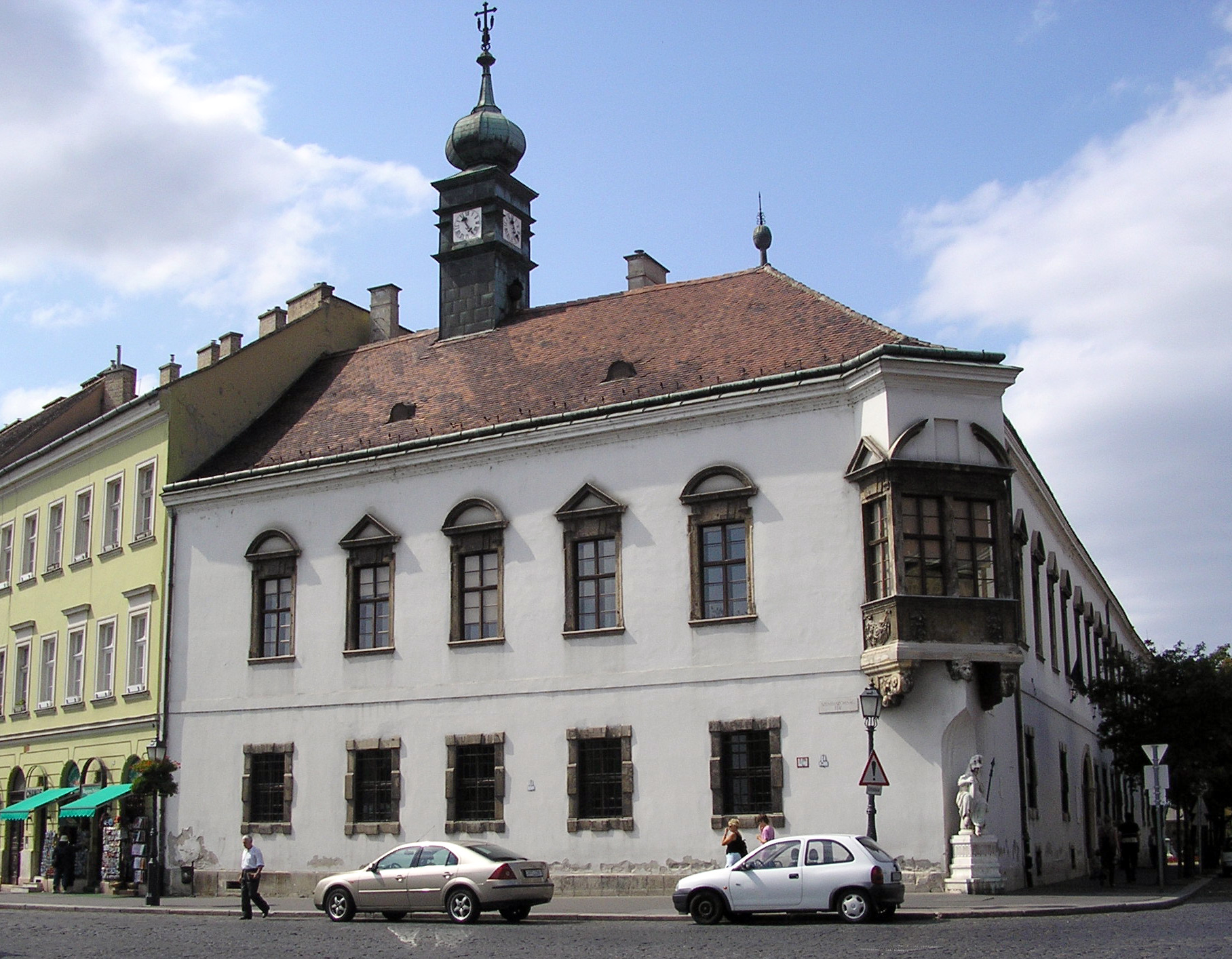
- Type: Private
- Established: 1992; 34 years ago
- Affiliation: Central European University
- Location: Budapest, Hungary
- Campus: Urban
- Website: ias.ceu.edu

The Institute for Advanced Study at Central European University (IAS CEU), previously known as Collegium Budapest, is a research institution in Budapest, Hungary.

== History ==
Established in 1992, it was originally planned for social sciences, but biology and physics were added later. The institute was modeled on the Institute for Advanced Study in Princeton. However, the continuation of the institute's funding was called into question by the Hungarian state. The Collegium Budapest was located in the old town hall of Budapest.

The educational institution was dissolved on September 30, 2011. The reason for the dissolution was financing problems. The activities of the Collegium have since been continued on a smaller scale by the newly founded Institute for Advanced Study at Central European University (CEU IAS). The CEU IAS is currently based in the Marczibányi Palace in the city center of Pest, October 6 Street. The founding director of the CEU IAS was Eva Fodor. Since September 2015, the CEU IAS has been headed by Nadja al-Baghdadi.

At the same time as the founding of the CEU IAS, the Central European University also took over the Raoul Wallenberg Guest House in Buda, which had previously belonged to the Collegium. The guest house was built in 1999 with funds from the Swedish Knut och Alice Wallenberg Foundation and the Swiss Landis & Gyr Foundation. The guest house is named after the Swedish diplomat Raoul Wallenberg.
