= Vukša Veličković =

Vukša Veličković (Вукша Величковић; born 18 February 1979) is a Serbian writer, journalist, cultural critic, artist and online producer based in New York City. He is a recipient of Milena Jesenska Journalism Fellowship, former Chevening Scholar and a former Visiting Fellow at The Institute for Human Sciences (IWM) in Vienna.

Velickovic maintained a column on B92.net from 2005-2007 and was the culture editor in Serbian newsmagazine Evropa until its folding in February 2008. He has written about London culture and lifestyle on his blog City of Doom and has published essays and magazine articles on culture and politics across various European media.

After graduating in International Relations at the University of Belgrade, Velickovic received the UK Chevening Scholarship in 2010 to complete his MA Degree in Identity, Culture and Power at The School of Slavonic and East European Studies at University College London.

Velickovic has been the Creative Director and Head of Digital Media at Hominid Studio advertising agency with offices in Belgrade and New York City since 2013.

In 2019, he was the Creative Director for the award-winning advertising campaign "I am a donor, too. Because I support Serbia" by Hemofarm Foundation, which won two silver awards for Socially Responsible Campaign – Profit Sector, and Corporate and Internal PR, which are presented by UEPS – Serbian Association of Market Communications, as well as the Kaktus Award in the category ‘Socially responsible integrated campaign’ at the festival of integrated communications – KAKTUS 2019.

His first novel Gužva ('Crowd'), published in Serbian by Alexandria Press in 2003, contained a book-soundtrack CD featuring emerging electronic music artists from the Balkans.

In 2011, Velickovic founded Bturn, online culture magazine for the Balkans where he worked as Editor-in-Chief until its folding in 2014.

Velickovic is also a interdisciplinary artist, interacting his writings with other media such as music, video and photography. From 2003 to 2006, he was the author of "If I were" column in Belgrade's 'Prestup' magazine, where he dealt with political provocation, enacting different social roles – the prime minister's chauffeur, a street beggar, a TV news presenter, or a drag queen on the trail of a mass grave. His second novel 'Vrt Uživanja' [Garden of Pleasure] was staged as a multimedia act at international festivals in Belgrade and Zagreb.

Velickovic performs live as a "trance blues" musician under the stage name Frank Magnolia, with a debut album "Almost There" released in 2019 and a follow-up "Night Rider" in 2021. He has performed at various clubs and venues in the US, Switzerland, Italy, Austria, Germany, Serbia, Croatia, Montenegro, and Slovenia. In 2018, he was the winner of Belgrade's "CantOut" singer-songwriter festival, with Petar Janjatovic as head of the jury. His Live EP "Got Juice Got Gas" was released in April, 2024.
