= Central European University =

Private research university in Vienna, Austria

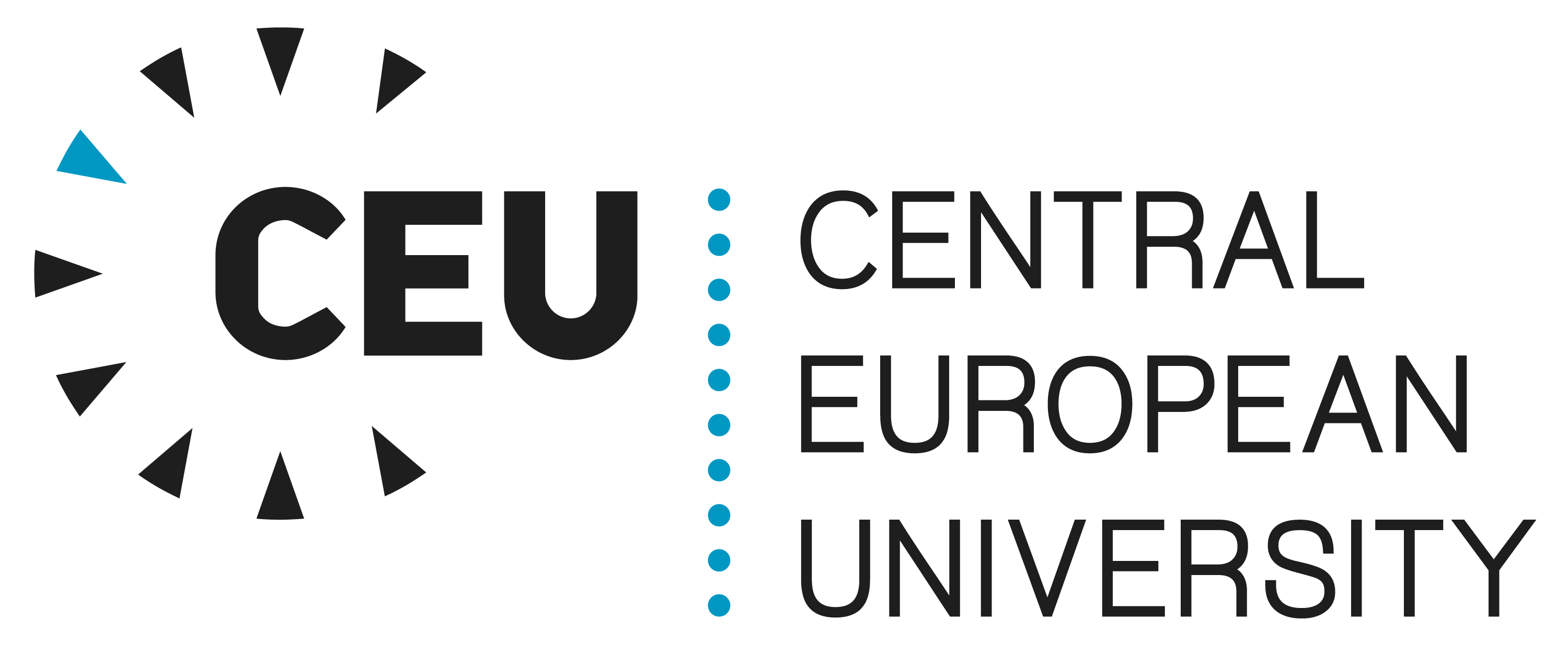
- Type: Private research university
- Established: 1991; 35 years ago
- Founder: George Soros
- Affiliations: CIVICA; Europaeum; EUA
- Endowment: €554 million
- President: Carsten Q. Schneider
- Rector: Carsten Q. Schneider
- Faculty: 200 (2025–26)
- Administrative staff: 775 (2018–19)
- Students: 1,429 (2025–26)
- Undergraduates: 253 (2025–26)
- Postgraduates: 669 (2025–26)
- Doctoral students: 376 (2025–26)
- Location: Vienna, Austria; 48°10′26″N 16°23′18″E
- Campus: Urban
- Language: English
- Colors: Blue
- Website: www.ceu.edu

Central European University (CEU; German: Zentraleuropäische Universität; Hungarian: Közép-európai Egyetem) is a private research university in Vienna, Austria. The university offers graduate and undergraduate programs in the social sciences and humanities, which are accredited in Austria and the United States. The university also has a non-degree research and civic engagement presence in Budapest. It is a member of The European University of Social Sciences and Europaeum.

CEU was founded in 1991 by Hungarian-American investor and philanthropist George Soros, who provided it with a $250 million endowment in 2001, making the university one of the wealthiest in Europe, especially on a per-student basis. The university is considered elite and prestigious.

The university was founded in Central Europe because of a perceived need for an independent and international university for the region, in light of the Revolutions of 1989 and concomitant democratisation. A central tenet of the university's mission is the promotion of Austrian-British philosopher Karl Popper's idea of open society, a result of its close association with the Open Society Foundations.

== History ==
=== Early years (1989–1993) ===
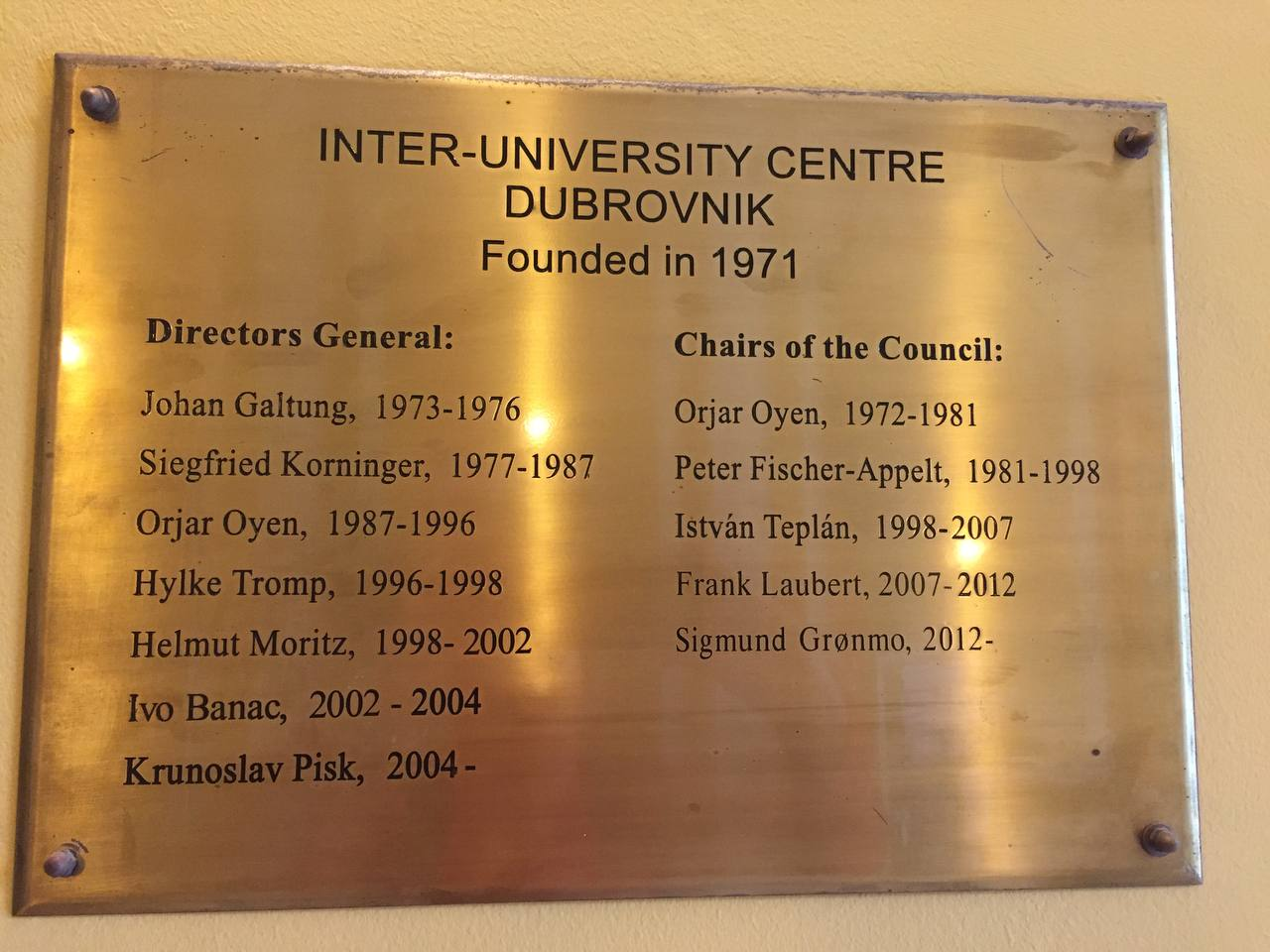
Inter-University Centre Dubrovnik

CEU evolved from a series of lectures held at the Inter-University Centre Dubrovnik in Dubrovnik, Yugoslavia, (now Croatia). In Spring 1989, as historic change was gathering momentum in the region, the need for a new, independent, international university was being considered. The minutes of the gathering held in April 1989 record a discussion among scholars such as Andorka Rudolf, Hanák Péter, Tardos Márton, István Teplán, Miklós Vámos and Miklós Vásárhelyi from Budapest, William Newton-Smith and Kathleen Wilkes from Oxford, Jan Havránek, Michal Illner and Jiří Kořalka from Prague, and Krzysztof Michalski and Włodzimierz Siwiński from Warsaw.

In 1989–90, a serious attempt was undertaken to establish Central European University in the Slovak capital of Bratislava, but it fell through due to nationalist politicians' opposition.

The university was founded in 1991 in response to the fall of the Socialist Bloc. The founding vision was to create a university dedicated to examining the contemporary challenges of "open societies" and democratization. The initial aim was to create a Western-modeled yet distinctly Central European institution that would foster inter-regional cooperation and educate a new corps of regional leaders to help usher in democratic transitions across the region. CEU was set up in Budapest, Prague, and Warsaw.

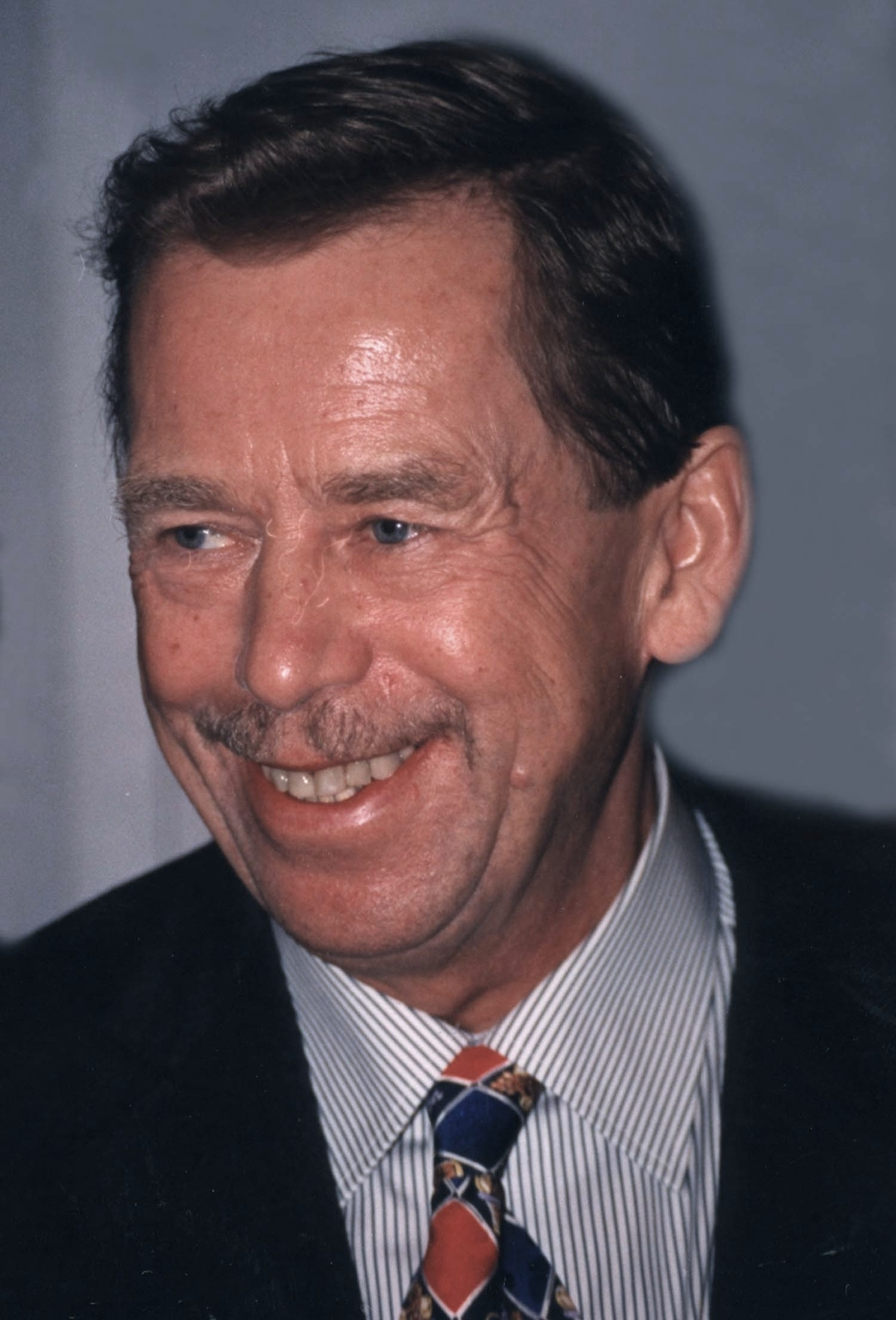
V. Havel

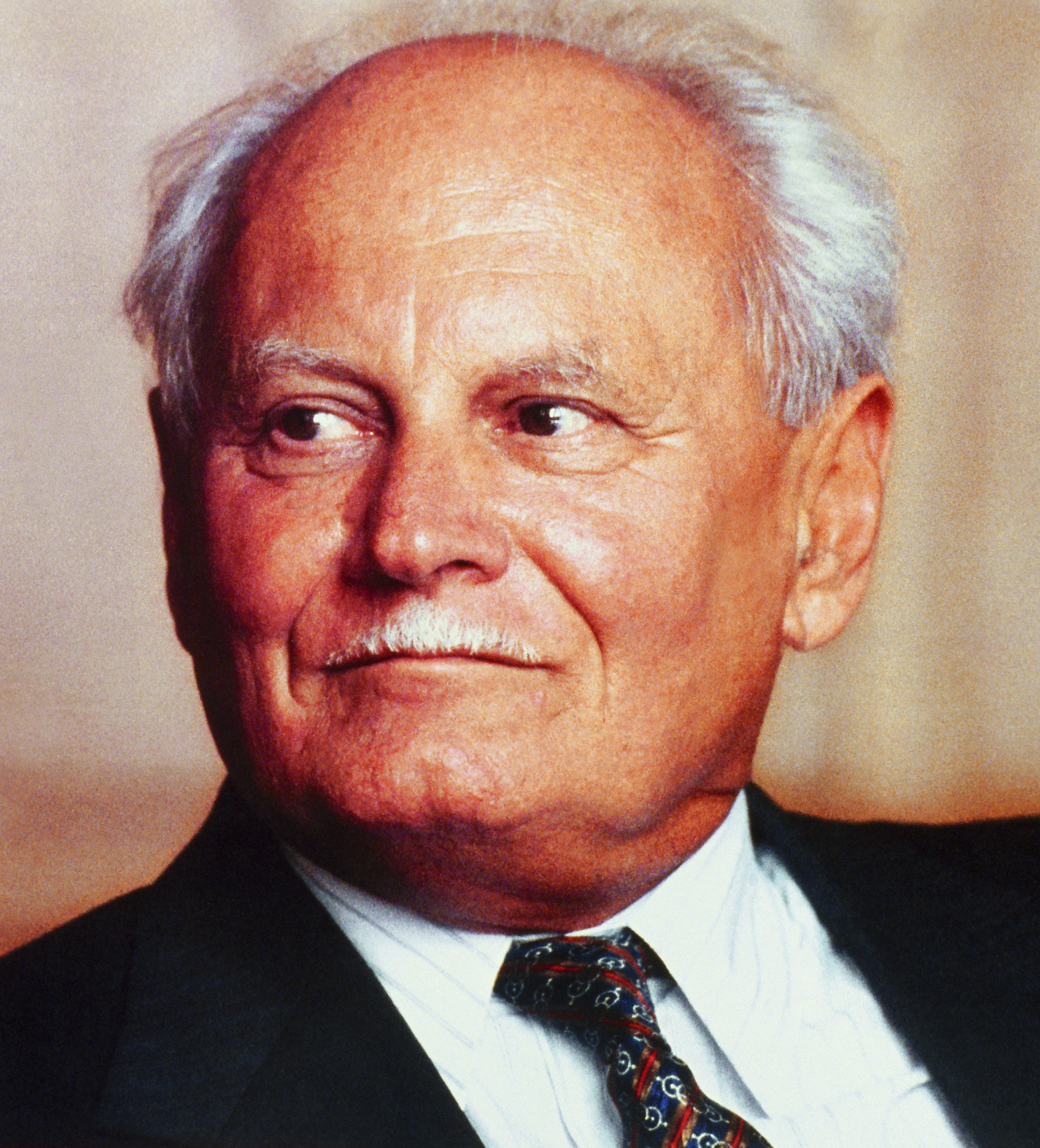
Á. Göncz

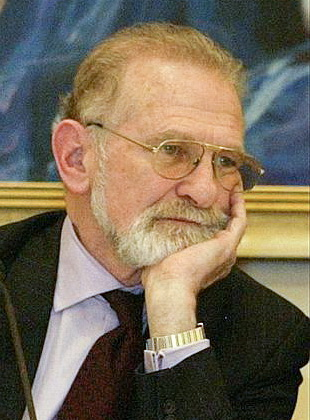
B. Geremek

The idea of a tri-city (Prague-Budapest-Warsaw) international graduate school was supported by then Czech President Václav Havel, Hungarian President Árpád Göncz and Polish historian Bronislaw Geremek, who later became Polish Foreign Minister.

The university was originally located mostly in Prague, and held its first classes there with around 100 students from 20 countries. Because of "political and financial conflict between its founder and [the] Czech government", represented by then prime minister Václav Klaus, in January 1993 it was moved to Budapest. The university's presence in Prague ended in 1997.

=== Budapest (1993–2017) ===
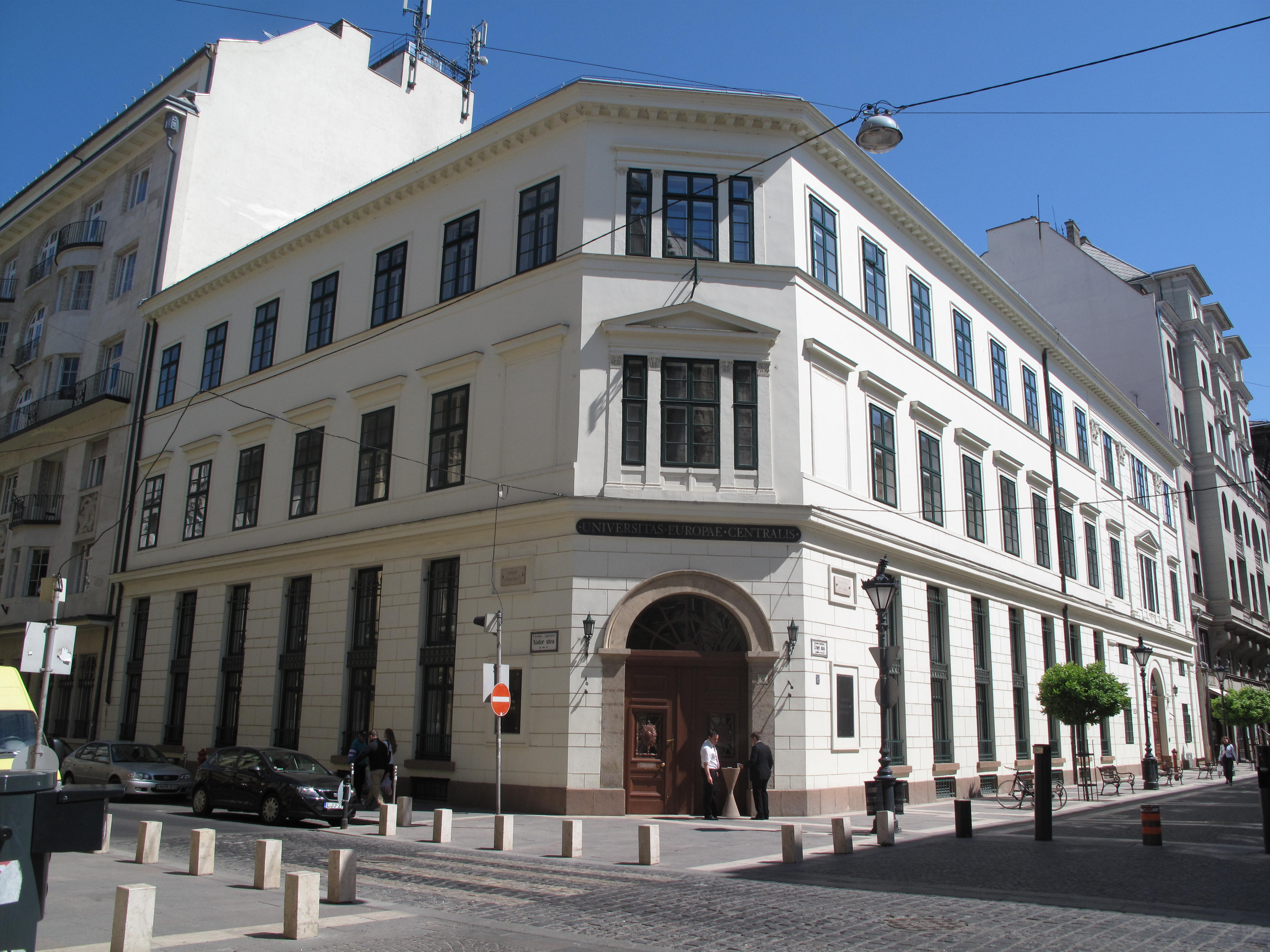
CEU Budapest building

In its second decade, CEU broadened its focus from regional to global, with a special emphasis on democracy promotion and human rights around the world. It has since developed a distinct academic approach, combining regional studies with an international perspective, emphasizing comparative and interdisciplinary research in order to generate new scholarship and policy initiatives, and to promote good governance and the rule of law. CEU has extended its outreach and financial aid programs to certain areas of the developing world.

CEU began the region's first master's degree programs in gender studies and environmental sciences. The CEU Center for Media, Data and Society (now the newly independent Media and Journalism Research Center) is the leading center of research on media, communication, and information policy in the region. Soros was one of the largest contributors to CEU’s endowment, pledging $202 million to the university’s endowment in 2005, which was valued in 2010 at $880 million. On 14 October 2007, George Soros stepped down as chairman of CEU Board. Leon Botstein (president of Bard College, New York), who had previously served as the vice-chair of the board, was elected as new chairman for a two-year term. George Soros is a Life-CEU trustee and serves as honorary chairman of the board.

Old CEU logo

On 1 August 2009, Rector Yehuda Elkana was succeeded by human rights leader and legal scholar John Shattuck. In May 2016, Michael Ignatieff was chosen to succeed Shattuck; he took office on 21 October 2017, becoming the fifth president and rector of the university.

=== Relocation (2017–2019) ===
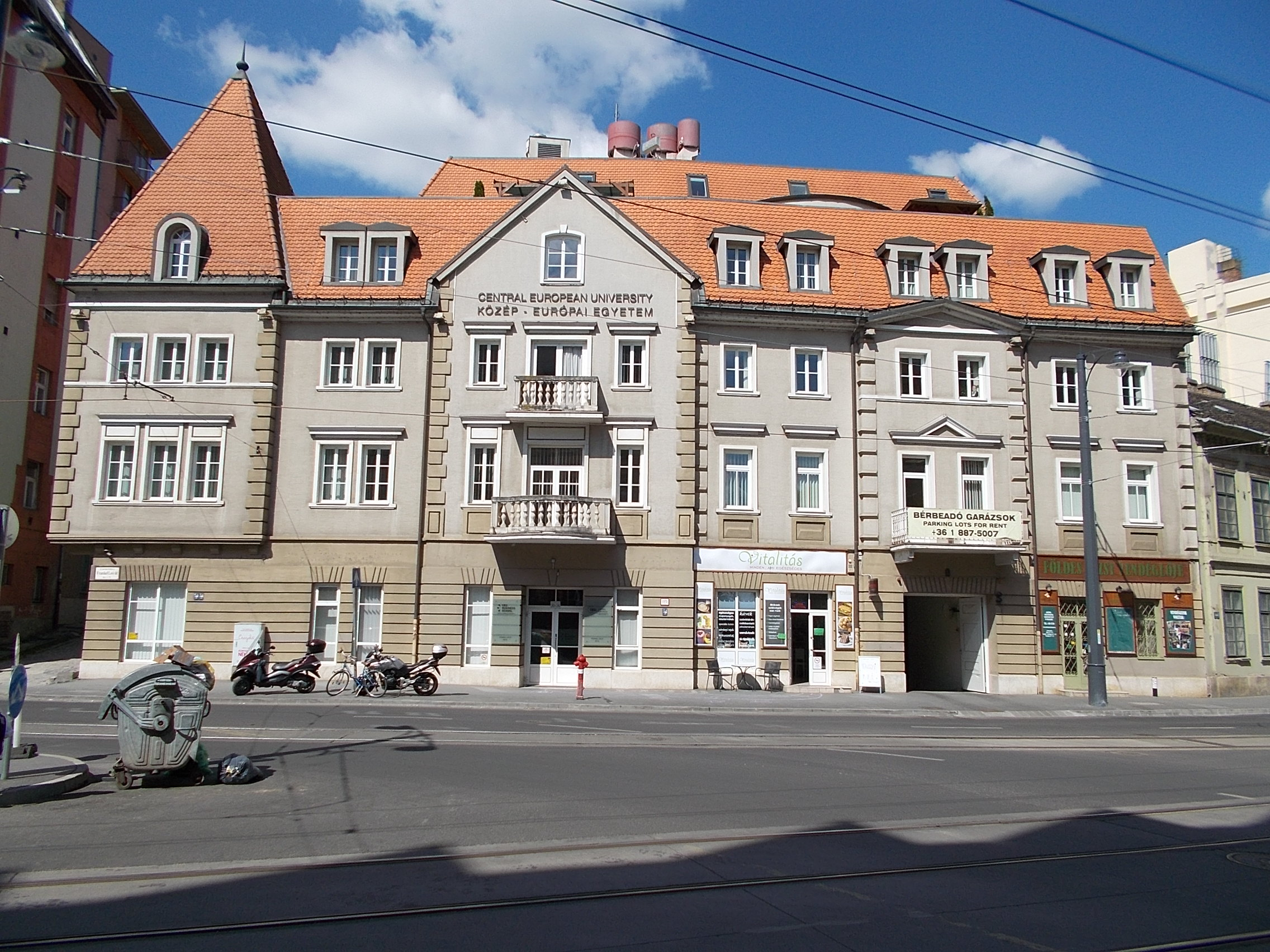
CEU Frankel Leó Street, Budapest

On 28 March 2017, Hungarian Minister of Human Resources Zoltán Balog, also responsible for education, submitted a bill to Parliament to amend Act CCIV of 2011 on National Higher Education. The bill proposed new regulations for foreign-operating universities, several of which would affect CEU. Notably, such universities could only operate if the Hungarian government had an agreement with the university's other country of operation. (CEU's operating agreement was between the State of New York and the city of Budapest). In addition, a university operating outside of the European Union should have a campus in its other country of operation, where comparable degree programs would be offered (in 2017 it was not the case for CEU). Furthermore, both current and new non-EU academic staff would be required to apply for work permits. This requirement was seen by critics as placing CEU at a particular disadvantage, given that it relied largely on non-EU faculty. Finally, the law would also prohibit the American and Hungarian entities from sharing the same name.

CEU opposed the bill, noting that "these amendments [to Act CCIV of 2011 on National Higher Education] would make it impossible for the University to continue its operations as an institution of higher education in Budapest, CEU's home for 25 years", and that "CEU is in full conformity with Hungarian law."

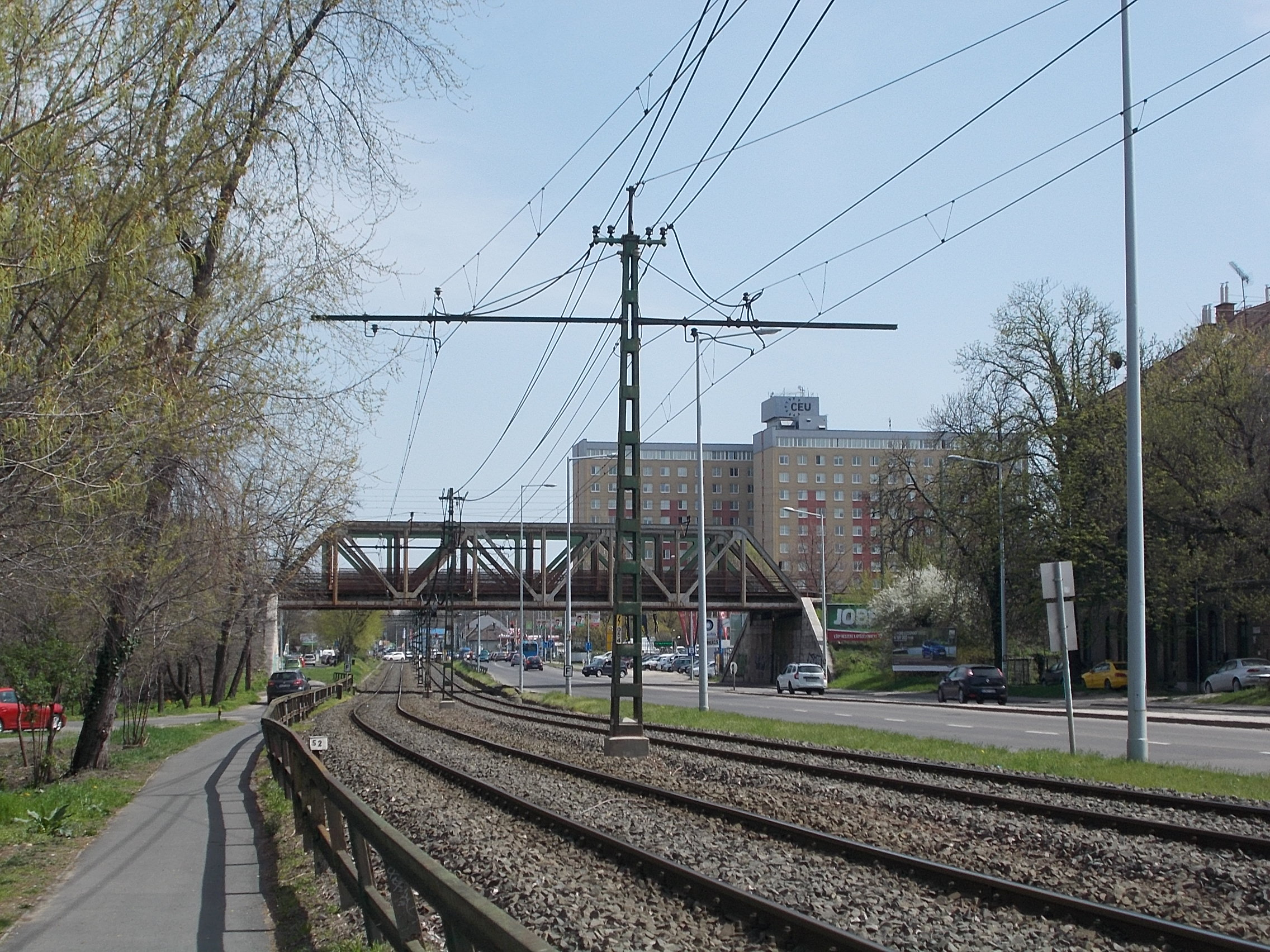
CEU Budapest Residence Center

The same day, the pro-government news website Origo.hu asserted that CEU, which it referred to as "Soros University" (George Soros being its founder and main benefactor, and also known as an opponent of Prime Minister Viktor Orbán and his Fidesz party), operated unlawfully in Hungary, citing regulatory infractions. Origo also referred to a report prepared by Hungary's Educational Authority, which revealed that 28 universities, including CEU, were being investigated for operating unlawfully in Hungary. CEU responded that the allegations of cheating and regulatory infractions constituted defamations and libel, and threatened to sue Origo if the article was not corrected.

On 29 March 2017, President and Rector-elect Ignatieff, Pro-Rector for Hungarian Affairs Zsolt Enyedi and, Pro-Rector for Social Sciences and Humanities Éva Fodor said that "the legislation tabled by the Hungarian government relating to higher education is targeted and discriminatory, attacks CEU, and is an unacceptable assault on our academic freedom... [and] the academic freedom of Hungarian higher education in general." Later, Ignatieff and Enyedi met Secretary of State for Education László Palkovics. CEU then called "for the government to withdraw this legislation and enter into negotiations to find a solution."

On 31 March 2017, Hungarian Prime Minister Viktor Orbán stated in an interview on public radio that the future of "Soros University" depended on US-Hungarian talks. He said that CEU was "cheating" by awarding both Hungarian and American degrees, despite not operating abroad. This was a breach of Hungarian regulations, which gave an unfair advantage to CEU over the other 21 foreign universities in Hungary. CEU responded that it was not cheating nor in breach of Hungarian regulations. Indeed, according to CEU, no laws in effect required universities such as CEU also to operate in their countries of origin. However, Szilard Nemeth, vice chairman of Fidesz, was more blunt, stating that civil society groups with funding from Soros should be "swept out" of Hungary.

On the same day, the first Trump administration expressed concern about the proposed legislation, which would "negatively affect or even lead to the closure of Central European University (CEU) in Budapest", and urging the Hungarian government not to take "any legislative action that would compromise CEU's operations or independence."

Hungary's ombudsman for educational rights, Lajos Aary-Tamas, called the amendment to the Higher Education Law "discriminatory against CEU", and said that during his 17 years in office he had never received any complaint about CEU's legal status. Hungarian EU Commissioner for Education, Culture, Multilingualism and Youth Tibor Navracsics (a Hungarian), and former President of Hungary László Sólyom also expressed support.

Academics and academic institutions from Hungary, Latvia, Poland, Russia, Romania, Germany, the Netherlands, the United Kingdom, the United States, and other countries expressed support for CEU. CEU itself started a campaign of support, with the slogans #aCEUvalvagyok Central European University in Hungarian and #IstandwithCEU Central European University in English. The campaign used social media to call on supporters to express their solidarity with CEU and write to Hungarian representatives.

British author Tibor Fischer supported the legislation. Fischer defended Orban against "charges of antisemitism", indicating that the government "introduced Holocaust education into schools, passed a Holocaust denial law and...financed Son of Saul, a film about Auschwitz that [went on to win] an Oscar." He specified that he opposes the practice whereby CEU, being registered in New York City, can issue a diploma accredited in the United States but without actually operating a campus in America within the provisions of the law as every other Hungarian campus, a situation that he described as CEU students "getting a double bubble."

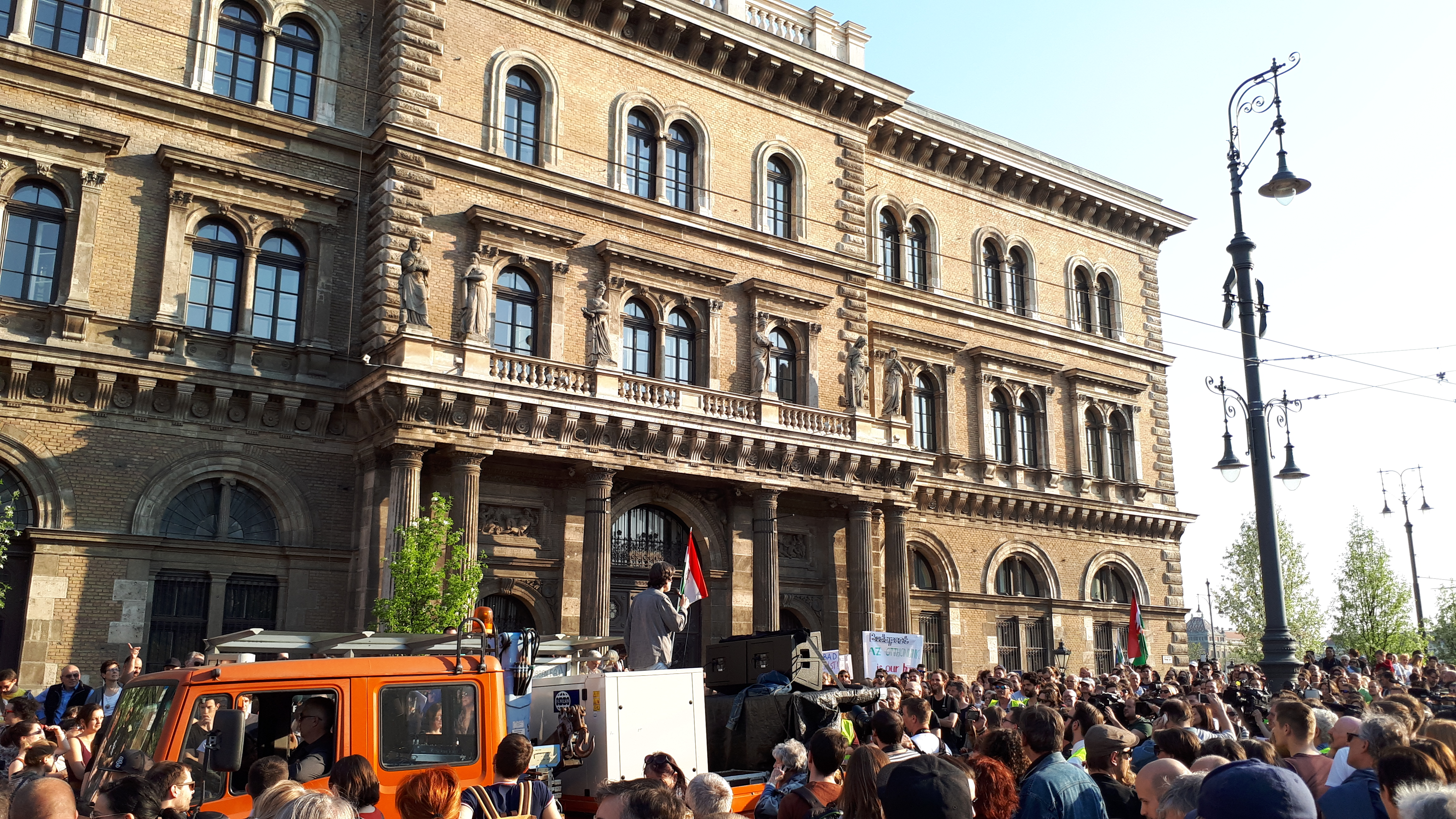
CEU protest in 2017, Budapest

2017 protests in Hungary were held on April 2 in the form of a walk from Budapest's Corvinus University to Parliament, passing by Eötvös Loránd University and CEU. The demonstration brought together thousands of protesters, with protest speeches by both CEU and foreign academics and activists, and was broadcast live on Facebook by Hír TV.

In the wake of the new Hungarian legislation, the Czech Minister of Finance Andrej Babiš proposed CEU be moved to Prague, Czech Republic, offering particular buildings in the centre of the city that the university might use.

On 3 April 2017, CEU submitted a legal memorandum to the Hungarian parliament, raising substantial issues about the legality and constitutionality of the proposed legislation, and pledged to continue to it using all available legal means in Hungary and in the EU. On the same day, the Hungarian parliament decided to debate and vote on the draft bill the following day, after a request by Deputy Prime Minister Zsolt Semjén, also head of the Christian Democrats, the junior party in the government coalition. Semjén said his request was justified by "government interests to pass the law early."

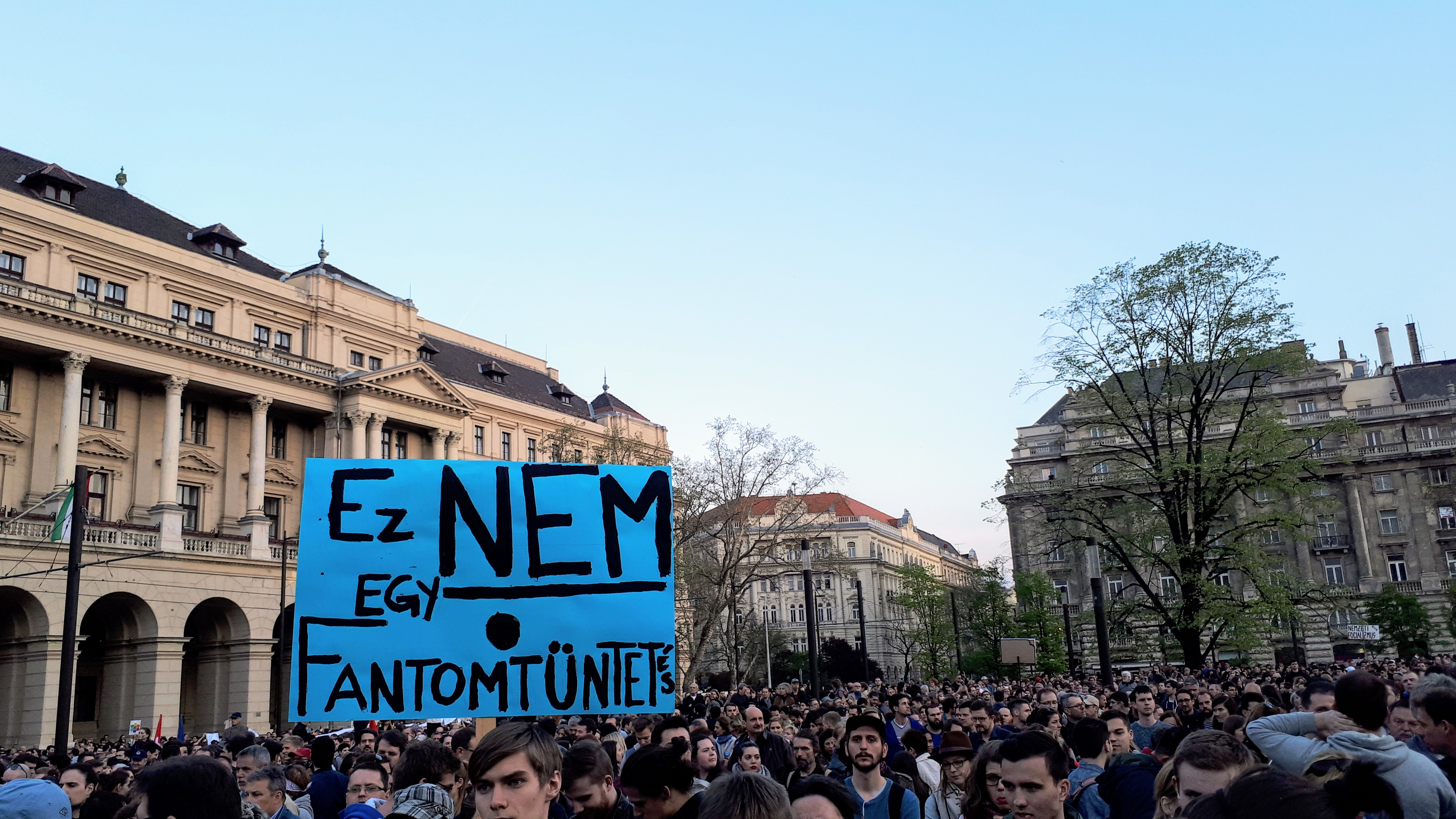
CEU protest in 2017, near the Parliament

The New York Times wrote "Mr. Orban has long viewed the school as a bastion of liberalism, presenting a threat to his vision of creating an 'illiberal democracy,' and his desire to shut it down was only deepened by its association with Mr. Soros, a philanthropist who was born in Hungary. [He] has spent years demonizing Mr. Soros, a Jew who survived the Nazi occupation of Hungary, accusing him of seeking to destroy European civilization by promoting illegal immigration, and often tapping into anti-Semitic tropes." Vox wrote that CEU "was a casualty of Prime Minister Viktor Orbán's turn toward authoritarianism, his development of a quietly repressive system that I've termed 'soft fascism'. CEU, a university dedicated to liberal principles and founded by Hungarian-American billionaire George Soros, posed a threat to Orbán's ideological project. So Orbán put into place a set of characteristically sneaky regulations aimed at forcing out CEU without needing to formally ban them, eventually crushing the university's ability to operate." The Washington Post commented that CEU had "become the prime target of Orban's campaign to dismantle Europe's multicultural, tolerant liberalism and cement a culture that is unapologetically Christian, conservative, and nationalist."

=== Vienna (2019–present) ===
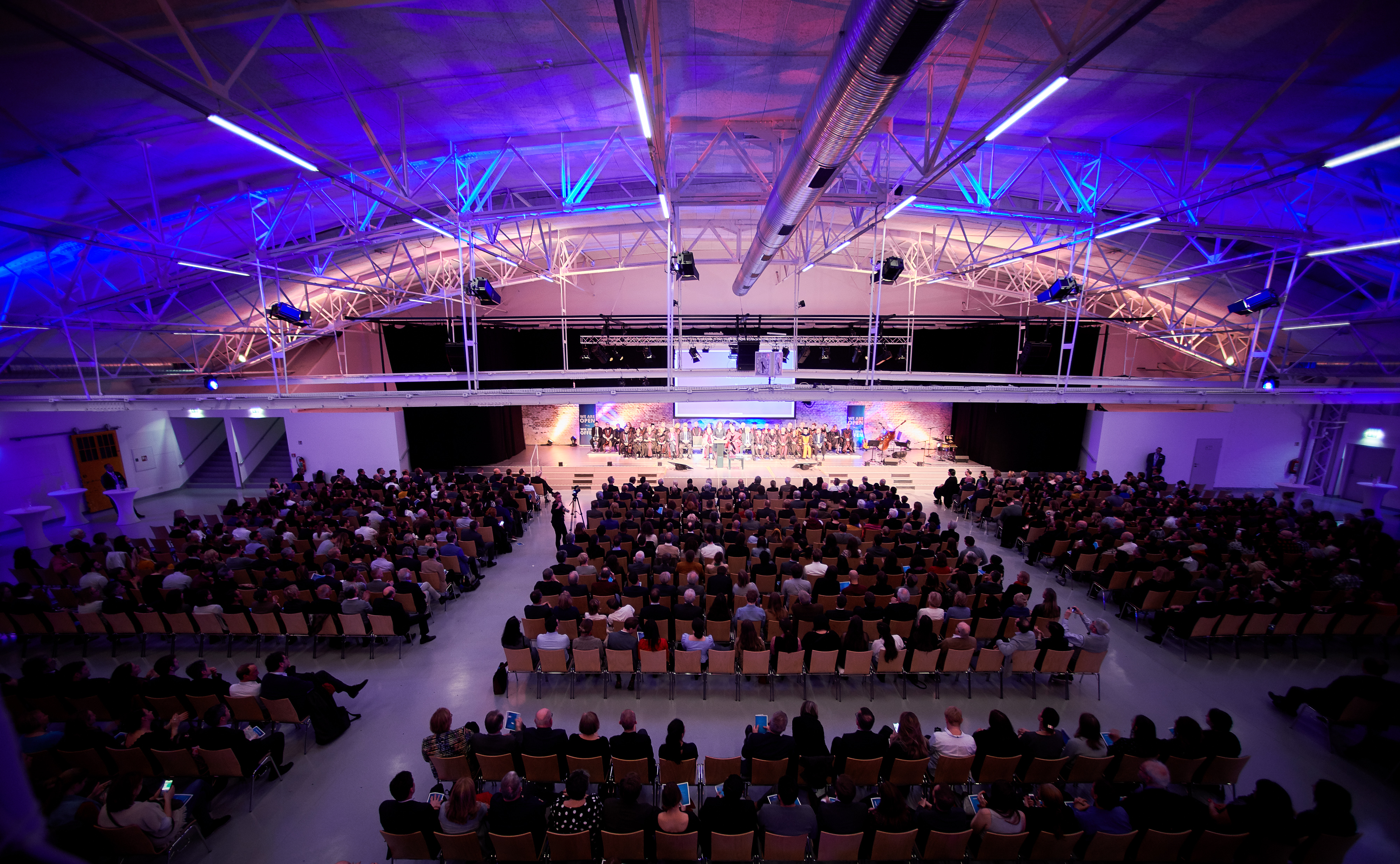
Inauguration of CEU Vienna Campus in 2019

On 3 December 2018 the university announced it would relocate the majority of its operations to Vienna in September 2019, after the Hungarian government's refusal to sign an agreement allowing it to continue teaching its US-accredited programs in Hungary. Less than one fifth of CEU's programs, that are locally accredited, would remain in Budapest. The university retains accreditation as a Hungarian university and has sought to continue teaching and research activity in Budapest as long as possible, with current students completing their studies in Budapest.

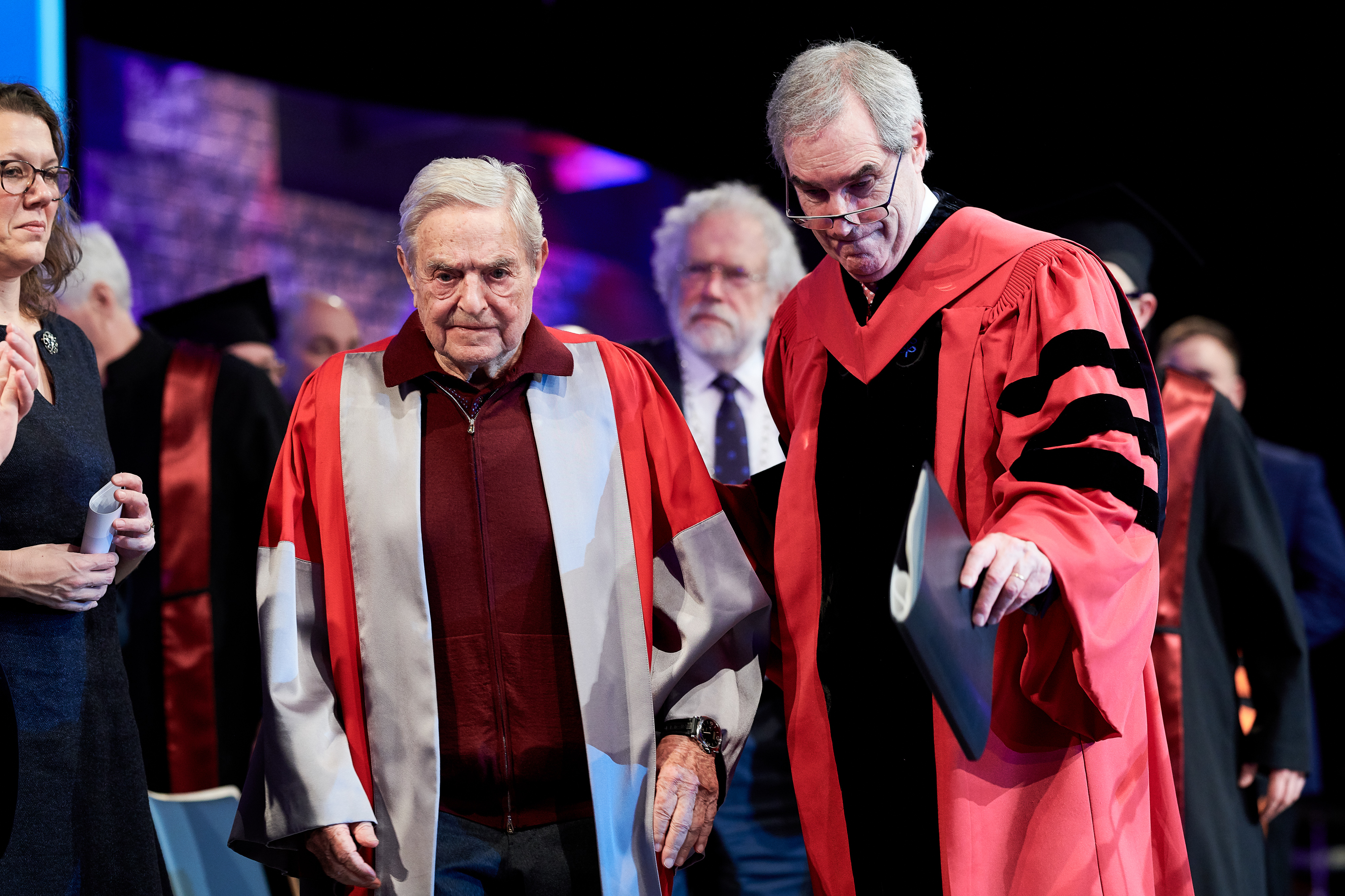
Rauskala, Soros, Zeilinger and Ignatieff at CEU Vienna campus in 2019

After failing to promote a deal between the US and Hungary that would keep CEU in Budapest, US Ambassador to Hungary, David Cornstein, an appointee of the first Trump administration, said on 30 November that the whole issue "had to do with [Orban and Soros]. It had nothing to do with academic freedom or civil liberties".

This withdrawal is the result of a long legal battle between the university and Viktor Orbán's government, and is set in the wider context of contemporary Hungarian politics. This situation has sparked discourse regarding academic freedom in Hungary, and spurred widespread protests in favour of CEU. On 6 October 2020, the European Court of Justice ruled that the "lex CEU" legislation, drawn up by the Hungarian government, was incompatible with European Union law.

In June 2021, Ignatieff announced that he would be stepping down as president and rector of the university, and that Shalini Randeria would succeed him as the sixth rector and president. Randeria is the first woman to serve in this role at the university.

In October 2023, Russia designated the university as an "undesirable" organization.

In the context of Hamas' attack on Israel on 7 October 2023 and the subsequent Gaza genocide, on October 14, the Jewish Studies Department published a statement in support of Israel. On October 20, the newly formed "Free Palestine Collective" at CEU published an open letter called "Drop the Neutrality, Condemn the Ongoing genocide in Palestine". The Department of Gender Studies published a Statement on the escalation of violence in Gaza on October 23. A series of events planned in cooperation with the University of Vienna, at which BDS activists were also due to speak, was canceled by the University of Vienna, nevertheless took place at CEU. A lecture at CEU entitled "CEU Talks: Hamas' 7 October Attack, Terrorism Strategy and State-building" was massively disrupted by students despite the presence of Rector Shalini Randeria. In a press release, the Austrian Union of Jewish Students and the European Union of Jewish Students accused CEU of ignoring the threat to Jewish students and that the Rector was refusing to meet with Jewish student representatives.

An open letter from the South-South Movement, signed by 180 CEU students and alumni and published on November 7, responded by rejecting the conflation of criticism to the country of Israel and semitism. Jewish CEU students also published an Open Letter on social media titled "Not in Our Name", which received support from organizations such as Jewish Voice for Peace. In January 2024, CEU students newspaper The Stand published a piece on it, framed as a debate between a full professor and a BA student who chose to stay anonymous to avoid retaliation. In it, philosophy professor Hanoch Ben-Yami claims: "There is no genocide in Gaza. Anybody who claims that is either ignorant or stupid or corrupt." The Stand did not editorialize or provide context to the claims.

In November 2024, Randeria resigned as a rector before the end of her term. According to media reports, she was pushed out by the board after intense internal criticism of her leadership. Carsten Q. Schneider was elected CEU's Interim President and Rector, and would serve from August 1, 2025 to July 31, 2026.

In February 2026, Austrian police entered the CEU Campus to ask questions about a staff member's stand at the entry, where she displayed books about the Gaza genocide. She was questioned in public and the anti-genocide stickers were confiscated. The interim rector Carsten Schneider reacted to it by claiming, in an email sent to the whole student body and staff, that CEU should defend academic freedom by appointing a special contact person on antisemitism.

== Organization ==
As of 2024, the university is composed of 13 academic departments and 17 research centers, in addition to the Doctoral School of Political Science, Public Policy and International Relations.

1. Department of Cognitive Science
2. Department of Economics and Business
3. Department of Environmental Sciences and Policy
4. Department of Gender Studies
5. Department of Historical Studies
6. Department of International Relations
7. Department of Legal Studies
8. Nationalism Studies Program (to be closed by the academic year of 2026)
9. Department of Network and Data Science
10. Department of Philosophy
11. Department of Political Science
12. Department of Public Policy
13. Department of Sociology and Social Anthropology
14. Doctoral School of Political Science, Public Policy, and International Relations

== Academics ==
=== Admission ===
In 2025/26, the acceptance rate of the university was 39% for bachelor's programs, 56% for master's program, and 10% for doctoral programs. As of 2019, 1217 students were enrolled in the university, of which 962 were international students, making the student body the fourth most international in the world.

CEU offers doctoral programs in 13 different subjects and master's programs in 37 different subjects, in addition to 3 interdisciplinary bachelor's programs. All programmes at CEU have a heavy research focus, and all courses are delivered in small, seminar-style classes, emphasising a low student-faculty ratio of 7 to 1.

=== Rankings ===
QS World University Rankings by Subject (2026)
Politics	45
Philosophy	51–100
Sociology	100
History	51–100
Social Policy and Administration	51–100
Anthropology	101–200
Law and Legal Studies	151–200
Economics and Econometrics	251–300
Social Sciences and Management	266
Arts and Humanities	196
Business and Management Studies	601–650

University rankings

Global – Overall
- QS World: 239 (2027)
- THE World: 269 (2027)

The university is considered elite and prestigious. Until the 2019–2020 academic year, CEU was exclusively a postgraduate university and therefore not eligible for general world university rankings. Two new bachelor's degree programs were introduced in the 2020–2021 academic year. It is ranked 239th in QS World University Rankings and 269th in Times Higher Education World University Rankings in 2027.

Regardless of this limitation due to the intentionally small size and specialised nature of the university, CEU has consistently performed well in subject rankings produced by various publishers. CEU has particular strength in disciplines such as political science, international relations, philosophy, history, and public policy, among others.

In 2014, the university's Economics department was ranked 8th in Europe by the European Research Council, based on research excellence. Of the three European Research Council Starting Investigator Grant that came to Hungary two were awarded to CEU faculty.

CEU's Department of Legal Studies was ranked first in Central Europe by the Czech newspaper, Lidové noviny. The survey included Austrian, Czech, German, Hungarian, Polish, and Slovak universities.

=== Accreditation ===
CEU is organized as an American-style institution, governed by a board of trustees, with a charter from the Board of Regents of the University of the State of New York, for and on behalf of the New York State Education Department. In the United States, CEU is accredited by the Middle States Commission on Higher Education. In Hungary, CEU is officially recognized as a privately maintained and operated university. The university was accredited by the Hungarian Accreditation Committee in 2004. In Austria, CEU is recognized as a private higher education institution, pursuant to section 7 of the Decree on Accreditation of Private Universities (PU-AkkVO). Central European University Private University (CEU PU) is accredited by the Agency for Quality Assurance and Accreditation Austria.

== Facilities ==
=== Library ===
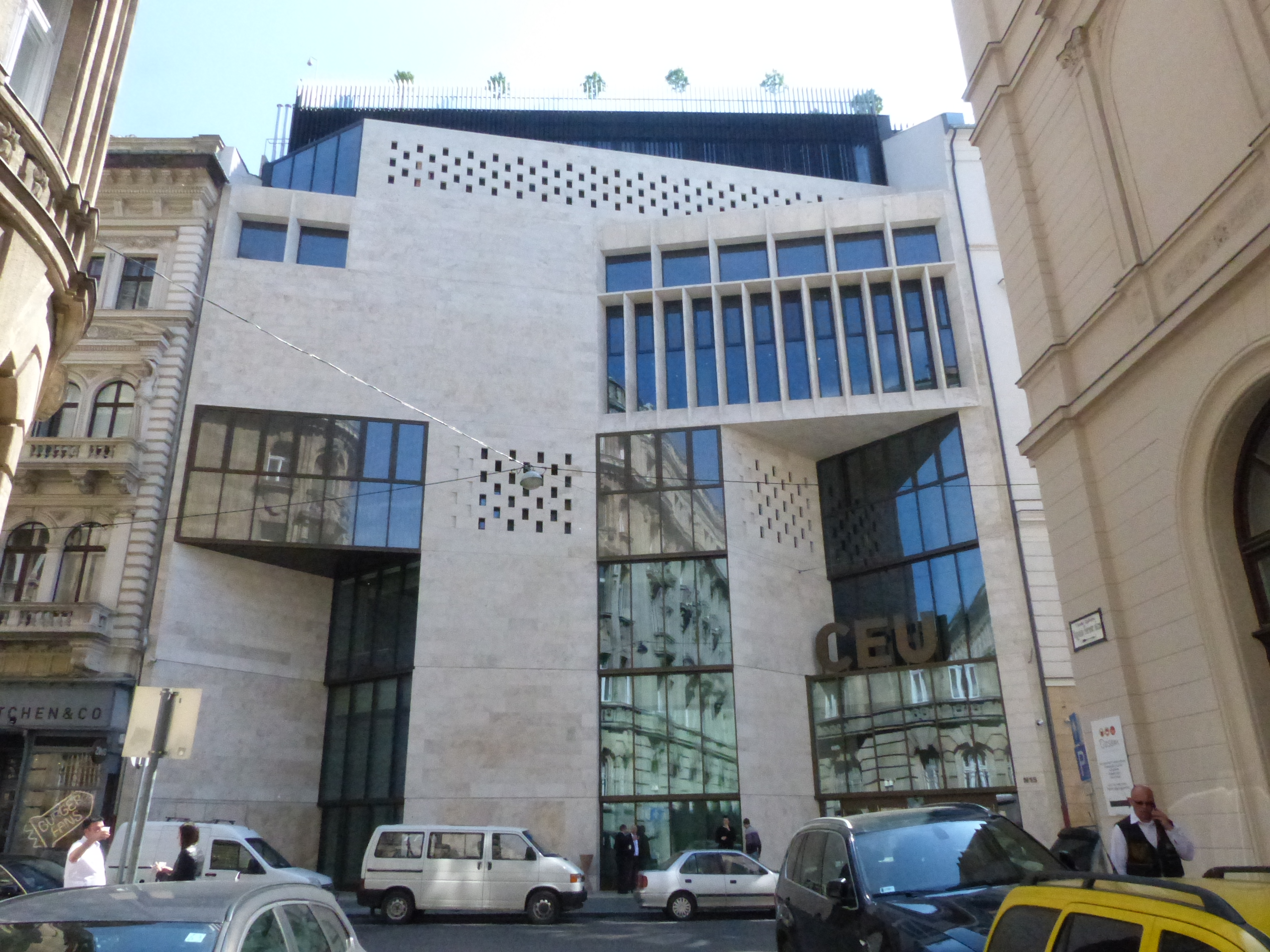
CEU Library

The CEU Library was opened in 2016, in Budapest, and was designed by O'Donnell & Tuomey. It has a large English-language print collection of more than 150,000 documents and over 50,000 e-journals and 200,000 e-books.

=== Institute for Advanced Study ===
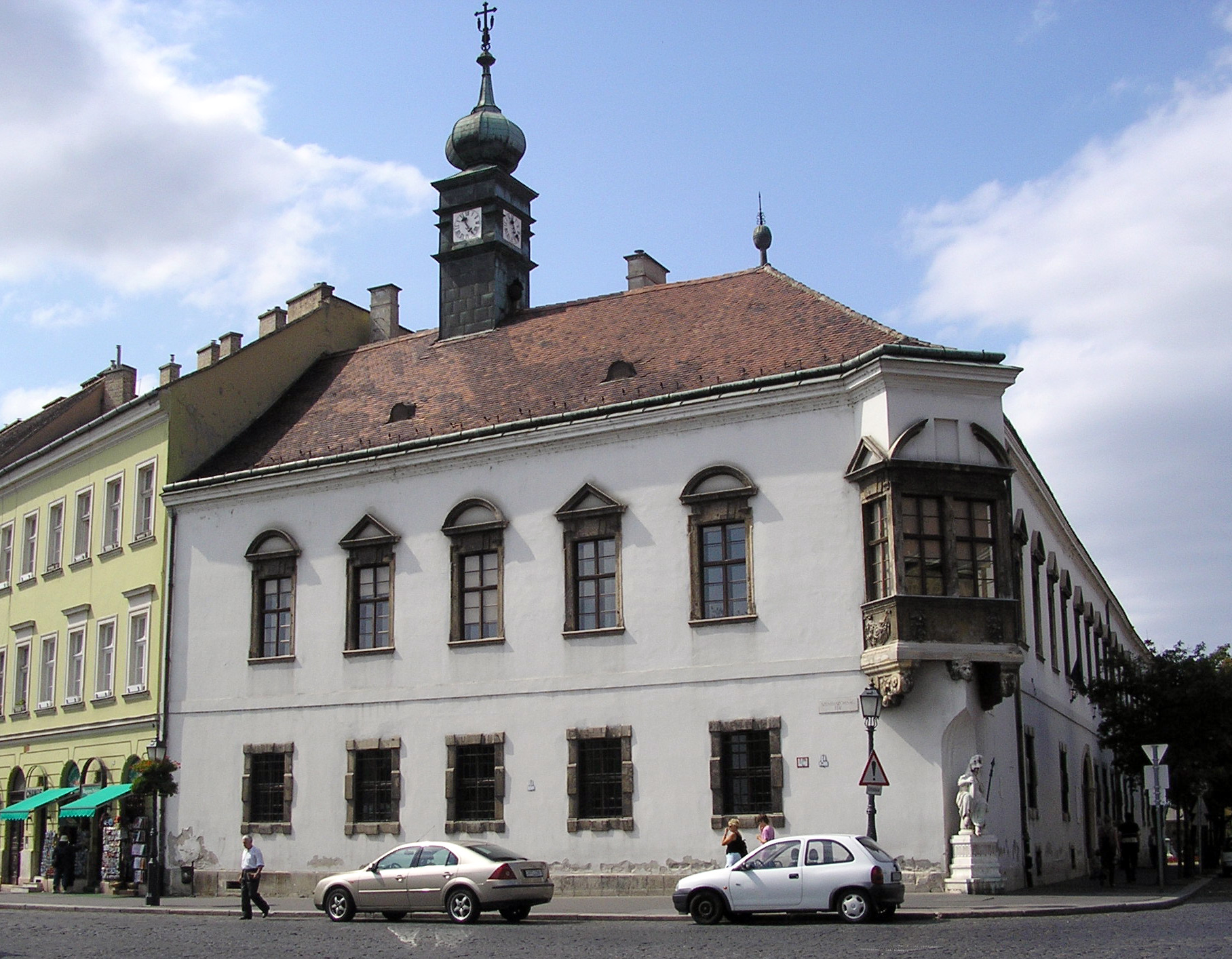
IAS CEU

The Institute for Advanced Study at Central European University (IAS CEU) is a research institution in Budapest, Hungary. Established in 1992 as Collegium Budapest, it was originally planned for social sciences. It was dissolved in 2011, while the activities of the Collegium have since been continued on a smaller scale by the newly founded Institute for Advanced Study at Central European University. The CEU IAS is currently based in the Marczibányi Palace in the city center of Pest, October 6 Street.

At the same time as the founding of the CEU IAS, CEU also took over the Raoul Wallenberg Guest House in Buda, which had previously belonged to the Collegium. The guest house was built in 1999 with funds from the Swedish Knut och Alice Wallenberg Foundation and the Swiss Landis & Gyr Foundation. The guest house is named after the Swedish diplomat Raoul Wallenberg.

=== Press ===
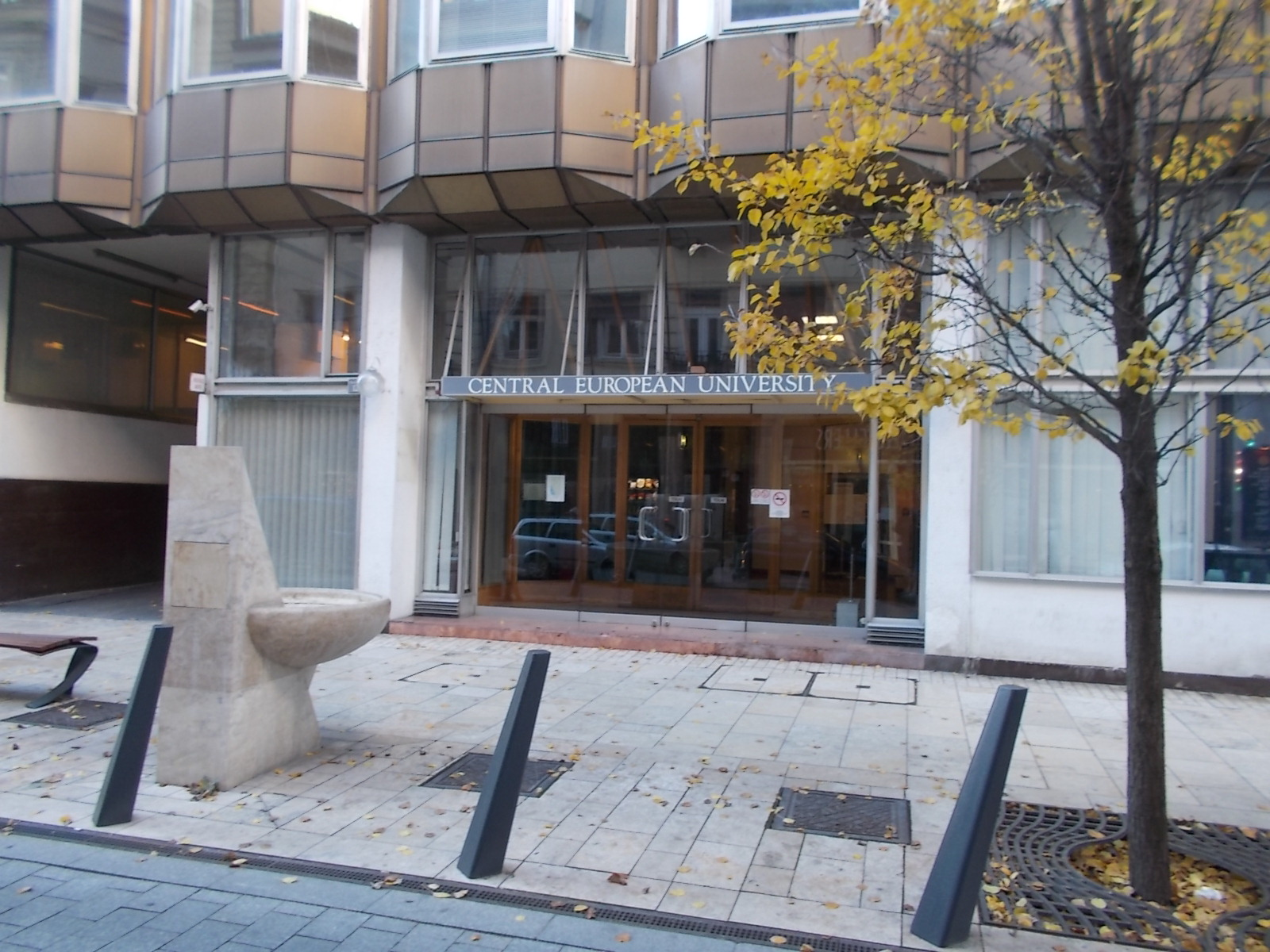
CEU Press

The CEU Press is the largest English-language publisher in Central and Eastern Europe. Since its founding in 1993, it has played an important role in publishing books on the economic, social, and political transformation of the region, including titles by Hungarians or on Hungarian themes. Four of its top-10 best-selling books worldwide are related to Hungary.

=== Archives ===
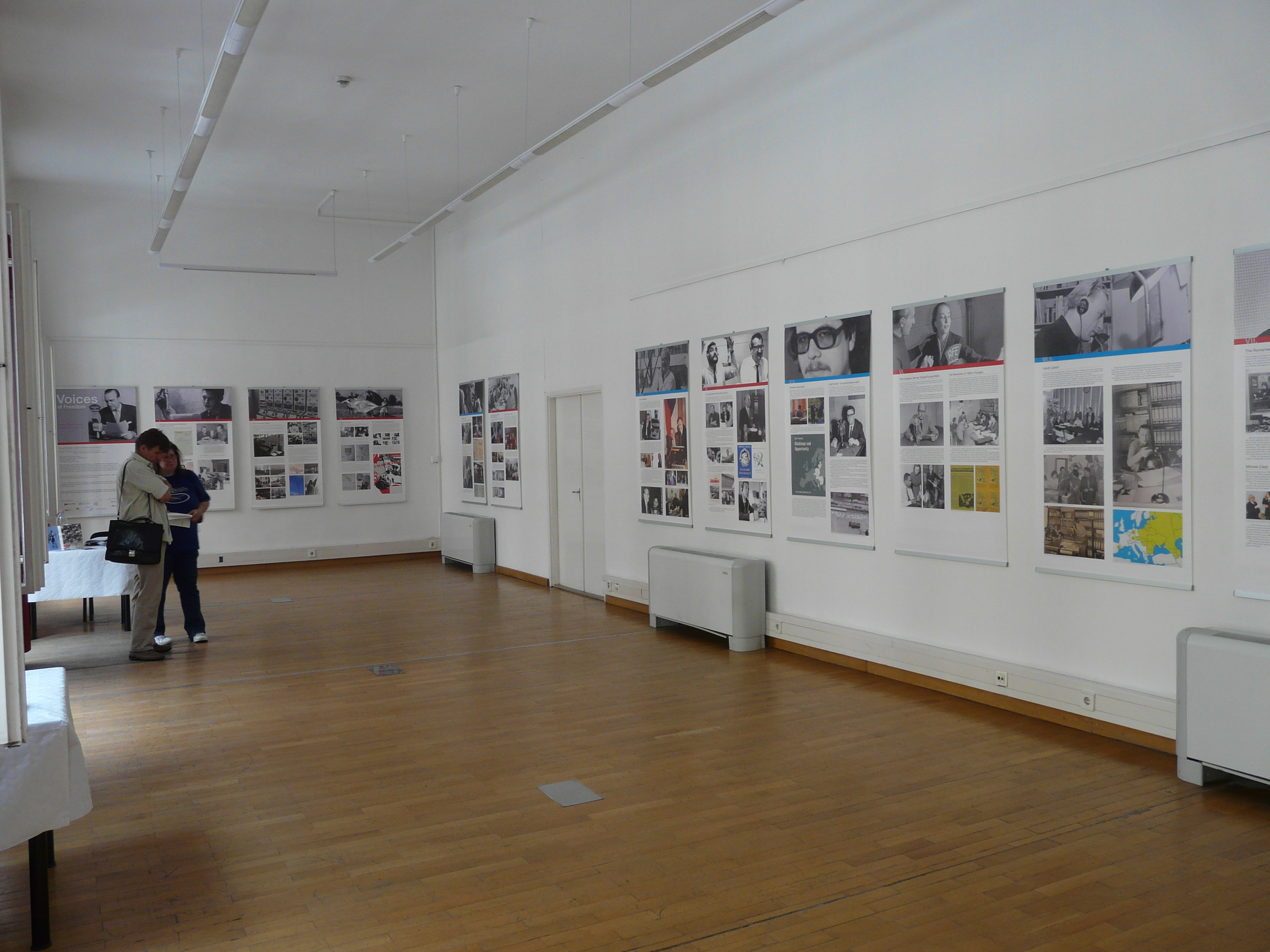
Blinken Archivum

The Blinken Open Society Archives (OSA) at CEU is a Cold War research facility, holding over 7,500 linear meters of material, 11,000 hours of audiovisual recordings and 12 terabytes of data related to communist-era political, social, economic and cultural life. OSA's collection includes an extensive archive of Radio Free Europe/Radio Liberty transcripts and reports, along with a large collection of underground samizdat literature and materials from Central and Eastern Europe under communism. The archive also houses a growing collection of documents and audiovisual materials on international human rights and war crimes.

== International relations ==
Graduate students of CEU and University of Vienna could attend courses at the partner institution, and transfer their credits towards their degrees at their home institution. CEU and Bard College run a joint master's program in international relations.

CEU has partnerships and student and/or faculty exchange agreements with Columbia University, Cornell University, Stanford University, University of California, Berkeley, University of Toronto, China University of Political Science and Law, École des hautes études en sciences sociales, ESSEC Business School, LMU Munich, Technical University of Munich, Eötvös Loránd University, Hungarian Academy of Sciences, European University Institute, Sant'Anna School of Advanced Studies, Hitotsubashi University, among others.

== Controversies ==
=== Epstein Files mentions ===
In 2026, with the revelations of the Epstein files, CEU's move to Vienna was revealed as an interest of the disgrace sex offender. Diplomat Terje Rød-Larsen wrote to Epstein about the university's move to Vienna, saying: "As you saw, my good friend Sebastian Kurz (31 years old!) was elected Austrian chancellor and will soon form his government. I texted him last week, and I think we are now in an excellent position to help CEU move from Budapest to Vienna. I have some great news about the situation from the highest circles in Hungary. I am having lunch with Michael Ignatieff, the university’s rector, in London next weekend.” Other messages report lunches between Michael Ignatieff, then CEU rector, Rod-Larsen, and Leon Botstein, Bard president.

=== Bogus self-employment of PhD candidates ===
In May 2026, Austrian magazine Profil reported that doctoral researchers at Central European University allege CEU has put them in a situation of bogus self-employment ("Scheinselbstständige" in German). This is defined by Austrian law as directing people who act as employees to register for insurance and pay taxes as self-employed, in order to deny them work benefits. Profil showed internal documents, leaked to the magazine, that show how PhD candidates are instructed to fill social security forms as self-employed, making claims about their work that directly contradict CEU's own Doctoral Regulations. The university's website confirms that PhD candidates have to register as self-employed in Austria. According to the report, CEU classifies PhD candidates as self-employed while formally forbidding them to find work outside the university without written authorization, and in this way the university "outsources tax responsibility to doctoral students and circumvents minimum standards".

According to CEU's Student Union President, interviewed in the report: "We are de facto integrated into the hierarchical structures of our institutes. We may not engage in any other employment outside the CEU without obtaining written permission. We also need permission to take vacation or leave Vienna for any reason“. In another point of the interview, she concluded: "This is clearly not self-employment. Rather, the current system amounts to denying workers' rights to highly qualified workers who contribute significantly to CEU academic standards“.

== People ==
=== Alumni ===
As of 2023, 18,667 students from 151 countries have graduated from CEU, the majority of whom went on to be employed in business, education, research, or government.

Among the university's alumni in law and government are the former President of Georgia, Giorgi Margvelashvili as well as the first Romani woman Members of the European Parliament Lívia Járóka and Monica Macovei, former Georgian Minister of Defense Tinatin Khidasheli, chairman of the Slovak Party of the Hungarian Coalition József Berényi, Azerbaijani opposition politician Ilgar Mammadov, and former Croatian Minister of Justice Orsat Miljenic. The international spokesman of the Hungarian government, Zoltán Kovács, is also an alumnus of CEU.

Central European University also has alumni who are academics in the social sciences, environmental sciences, and humanities. Jaroslav Miller, professor of history and rector at Palacký University, Előd Takáts, professor and rector at Corvinus University of Budapest, political scientist Tomasz Kamusella, Virág Blazsek, associate professor at the University of Leeds School of Law, historian of religions Andrei Oișteanu, vice-president of the Polish Academy of the Sciences Paweł Rowiński, and Serbian political scientist Srđan Cvijić are alumni.

The university also has alumni in the fields of art and activism, including Azerbaijani dissident Rashadat Akhundov, Hungarian LGBTQ+ activist Dorottya Rédai, and filmmaker Dylan Mohan Gray.

Notable Central European University alumni

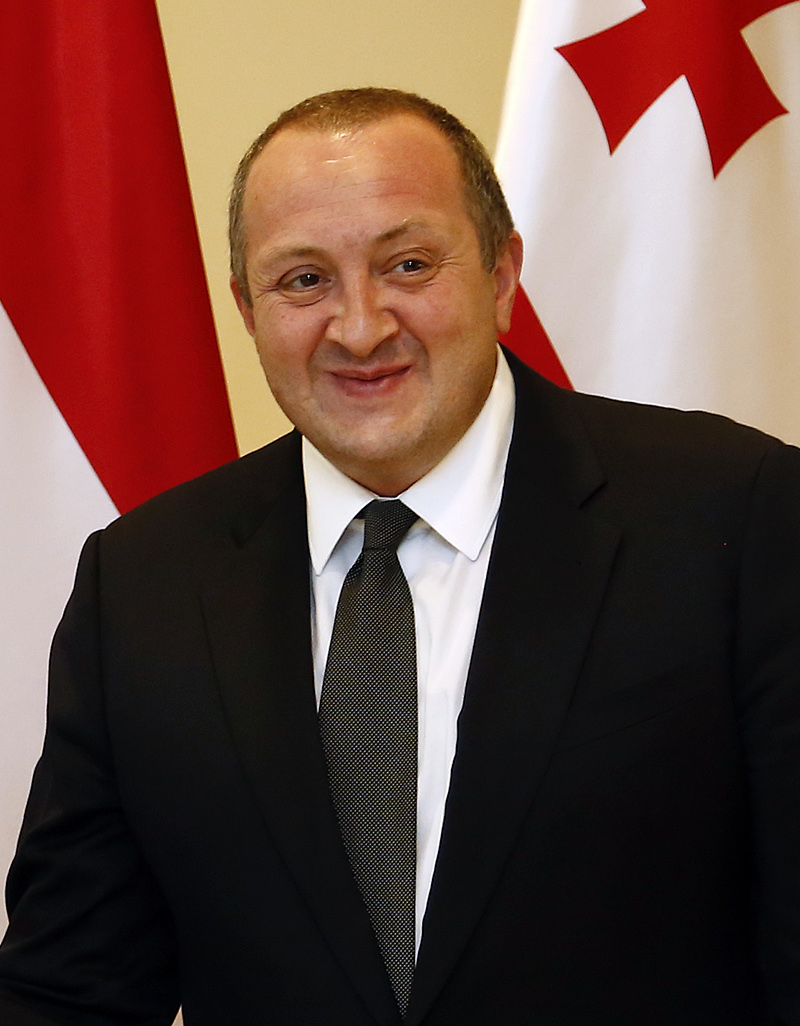
Giorgi Margvelashvili, former President of Georgia

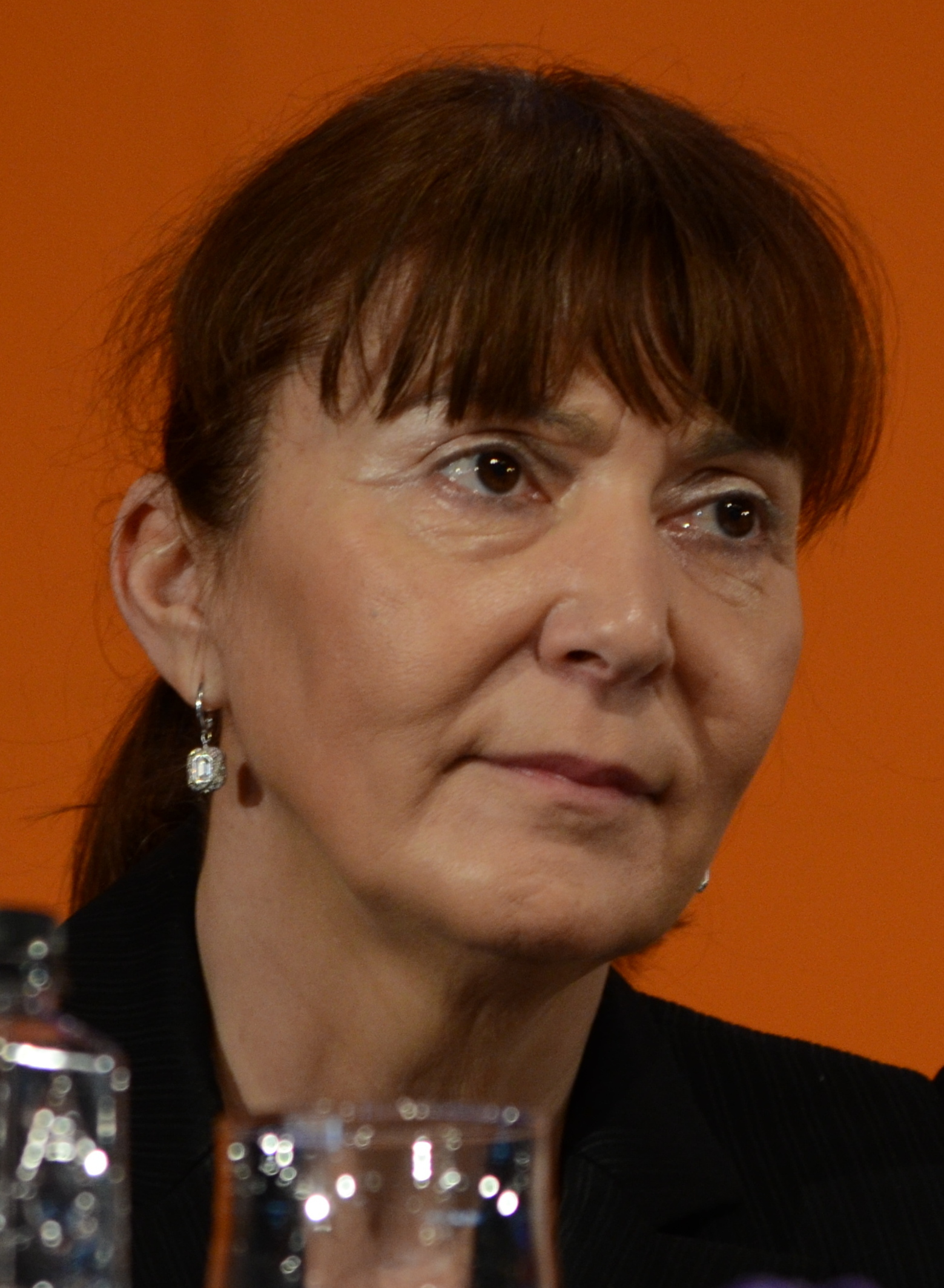
Monica Macovei, former Romanian Minister of Justice

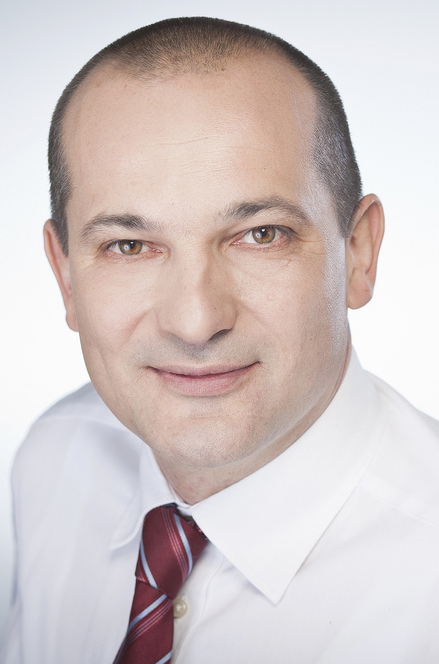
Orsat Miljenic, former Croatian Minister of Justice

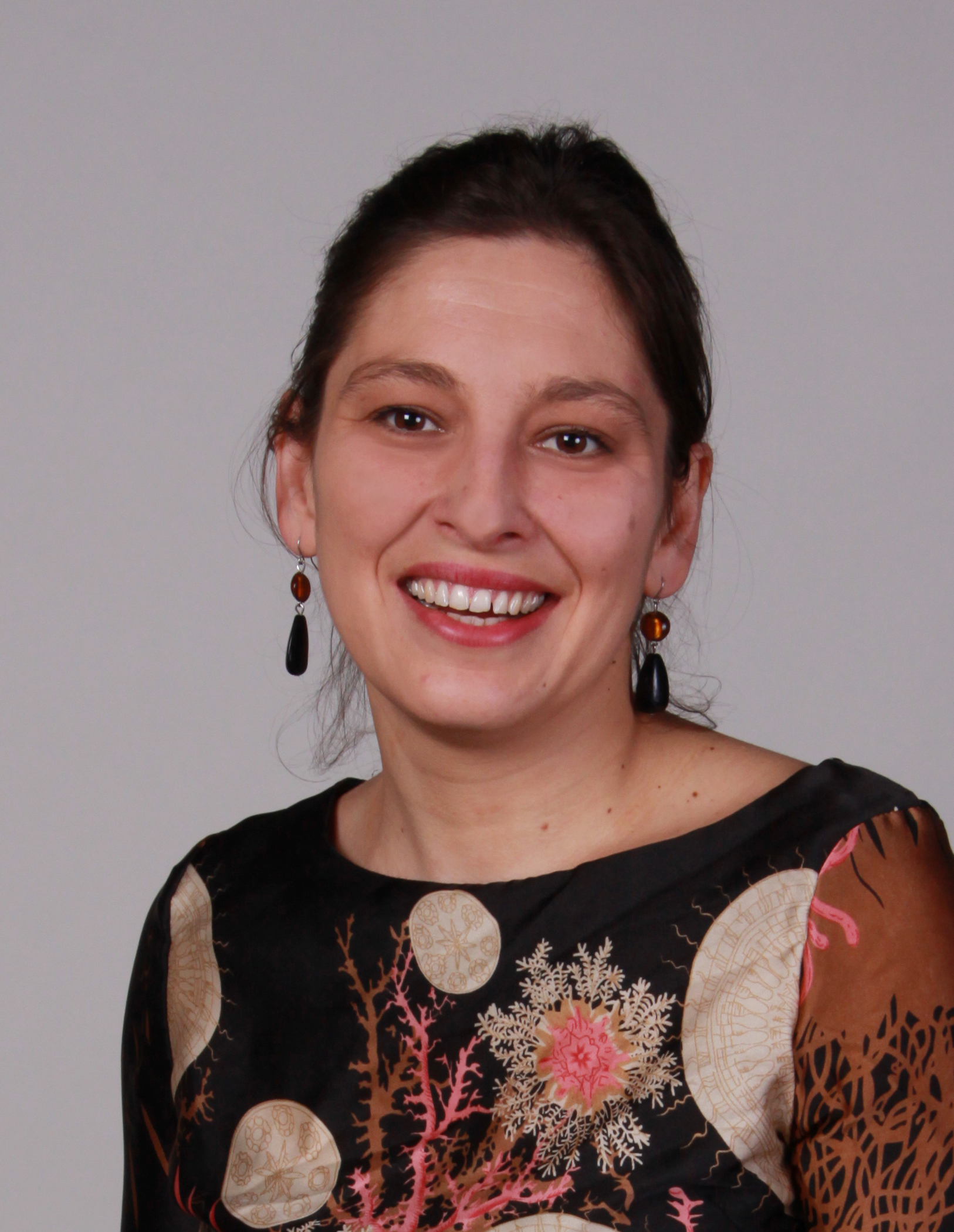
Lívia Járóka, former Vice-President of the European Parliament

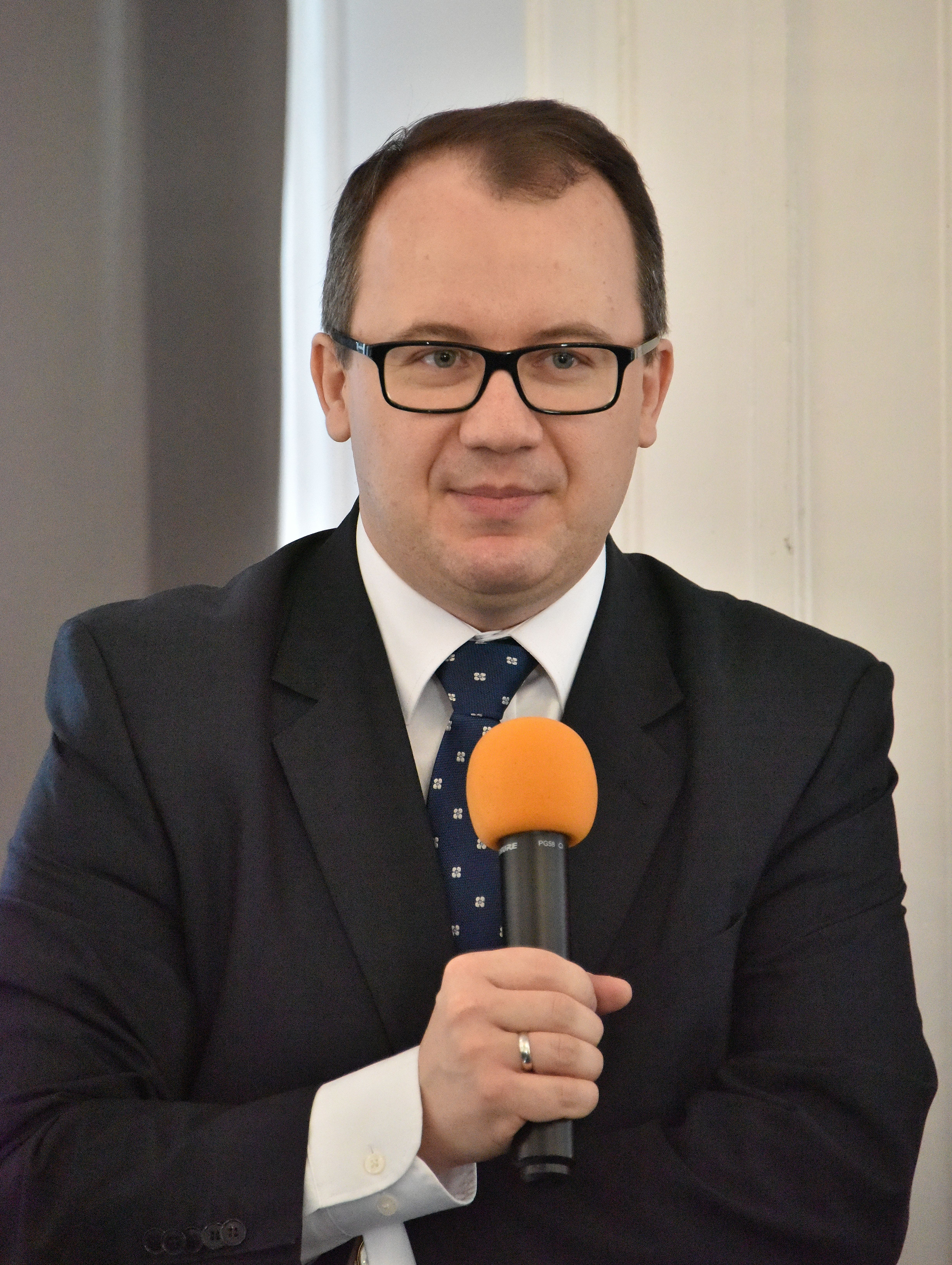
Adam Bodnar, current Polish Minister of Justice

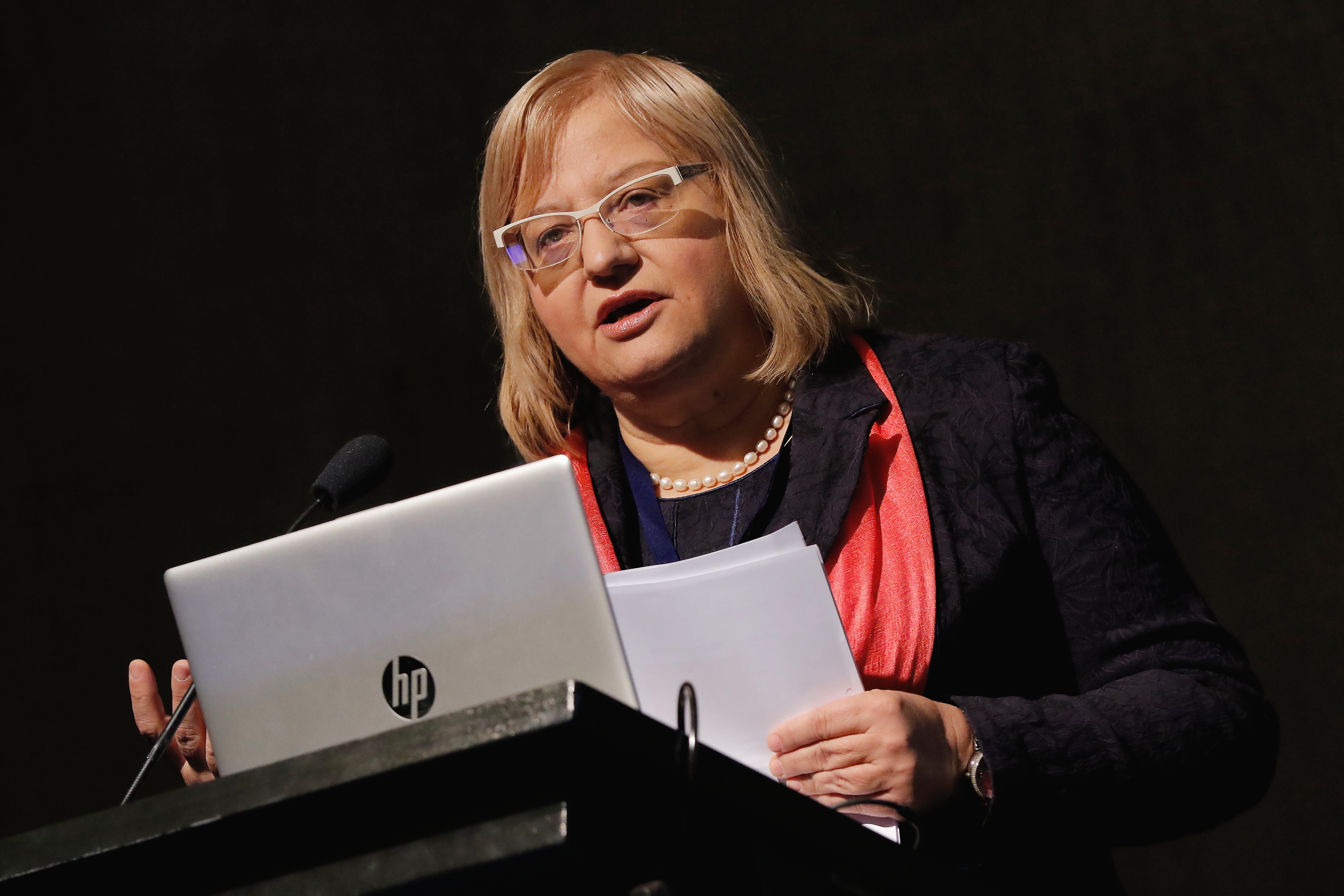
Mariana Kotzeva, current director of Eurostat

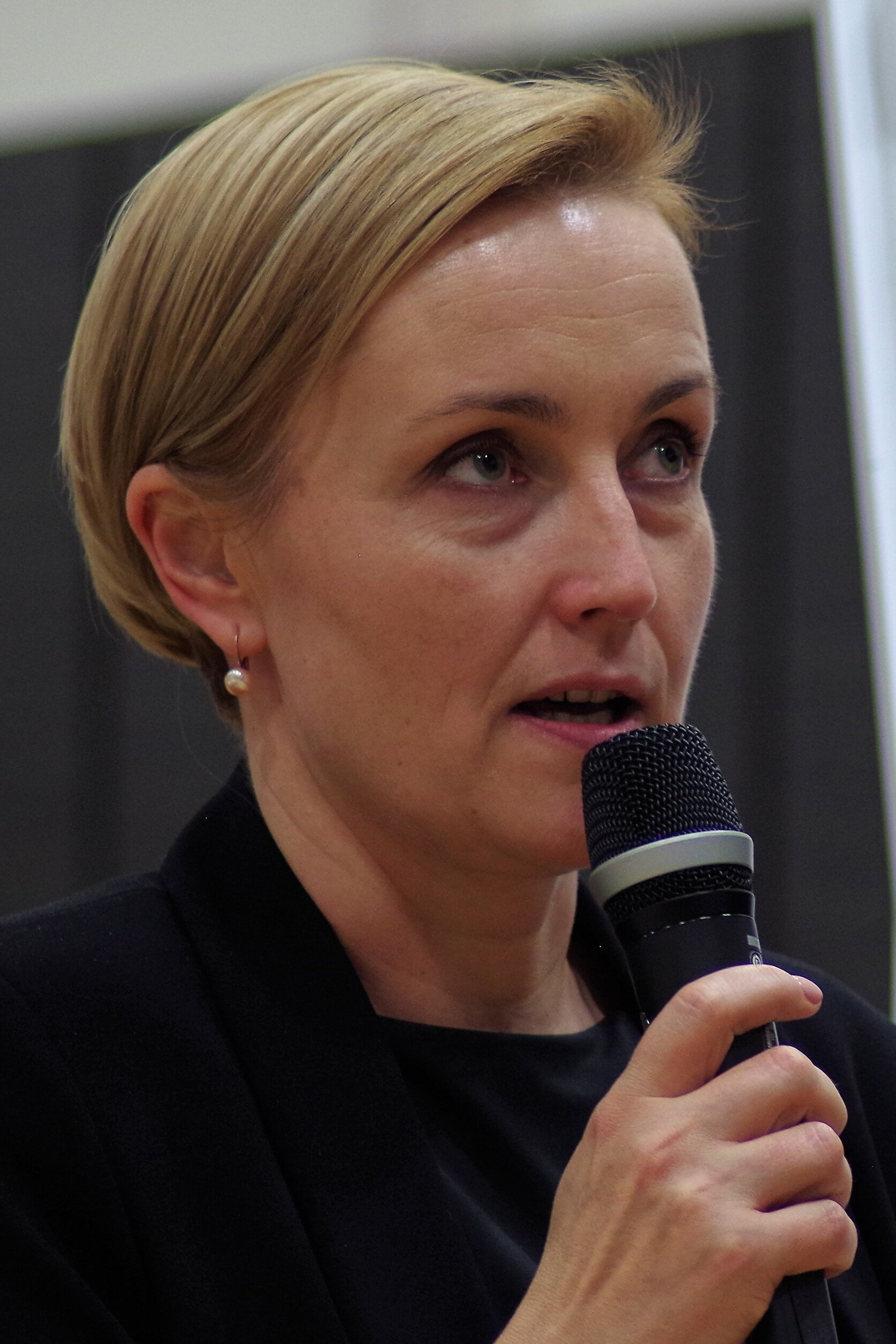
Kristina Kallas, current Estonian Minister of Education

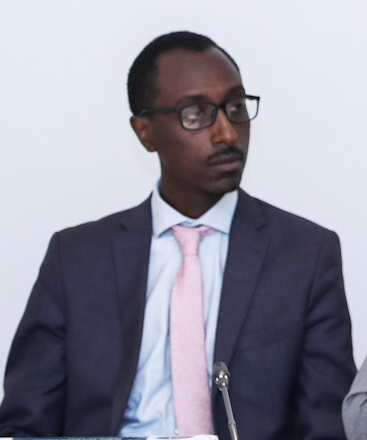
Gedion Timotheos, current Ethiopian Minister of Foreign Affairs

== See also ==
- Open access in Austria and Hungary
- Viktor Orbán, Fidesz, and Politics of Hungary
- Open Society
- College of Europe
- Occupy Wall Street
