= Velichkov =

Velichkov (masculine, Bulgarian: Величков) or Velichkova (Bulgarian: Величкова) is a Bulgarian surname. Notable people with the surname include:

- Boycho Velichkov (born 1958), Bulgarian footballer and manager
- Boyko Velichkov (born 1974), Bulgarian footballer
- Konstantin Velichkov (1855–1907), Bulgarian writer
- Lubomir Velichkov (born 1985), Bulgarian footballer
- Petar Velichkov (1940–1993), Bulgarian footballer
- Stefko Velichkov (born 1949), Bulgarian footballer
- Velichko Velichkov (born 1986), Bulgarian footballer

== See also ==
- Velichkov Knoll, mountain in Antarctica
