= Istvan Teplan =

Hungarian economic historian, sociologist and educator

István Teplán (Hungarian: Teplán István; born 1958 son of István Teplán Sr. biochemist and brother of Dr. Attila Teplán of ECHR) is a Hungarian economic historian, sociologist and educator, graduated from Harvard IEM in 1999. He is one of the creators of the first international Western-style graduate school in the post-communist Central Europe.

== Early life ==
Teplan was educated in Hungary and the US, where he studied with Immanuel Wallerstein at Binghamton University.

== Career ==
The idea of a tri-city (Prague-Budapest-Warsaw) international graduate school was supported by former Czech President Václav Havel, former Hungarian President Árpád Göncz and former Polish Foreign Minister Bronislaw Geremek.

With George Soros he was one of the founders of Central European University (CEU), a graduate school to train the next generation of leaders and to facilitate the democratic transition in East and Central Europe. He participated in the first meeting of CEU in Dubrovnik in 1989. As an Executive Vice President he served CEU between 1992 and 2007. Under his leadership CEU had developed into an internationally recognized institution of higher learning.

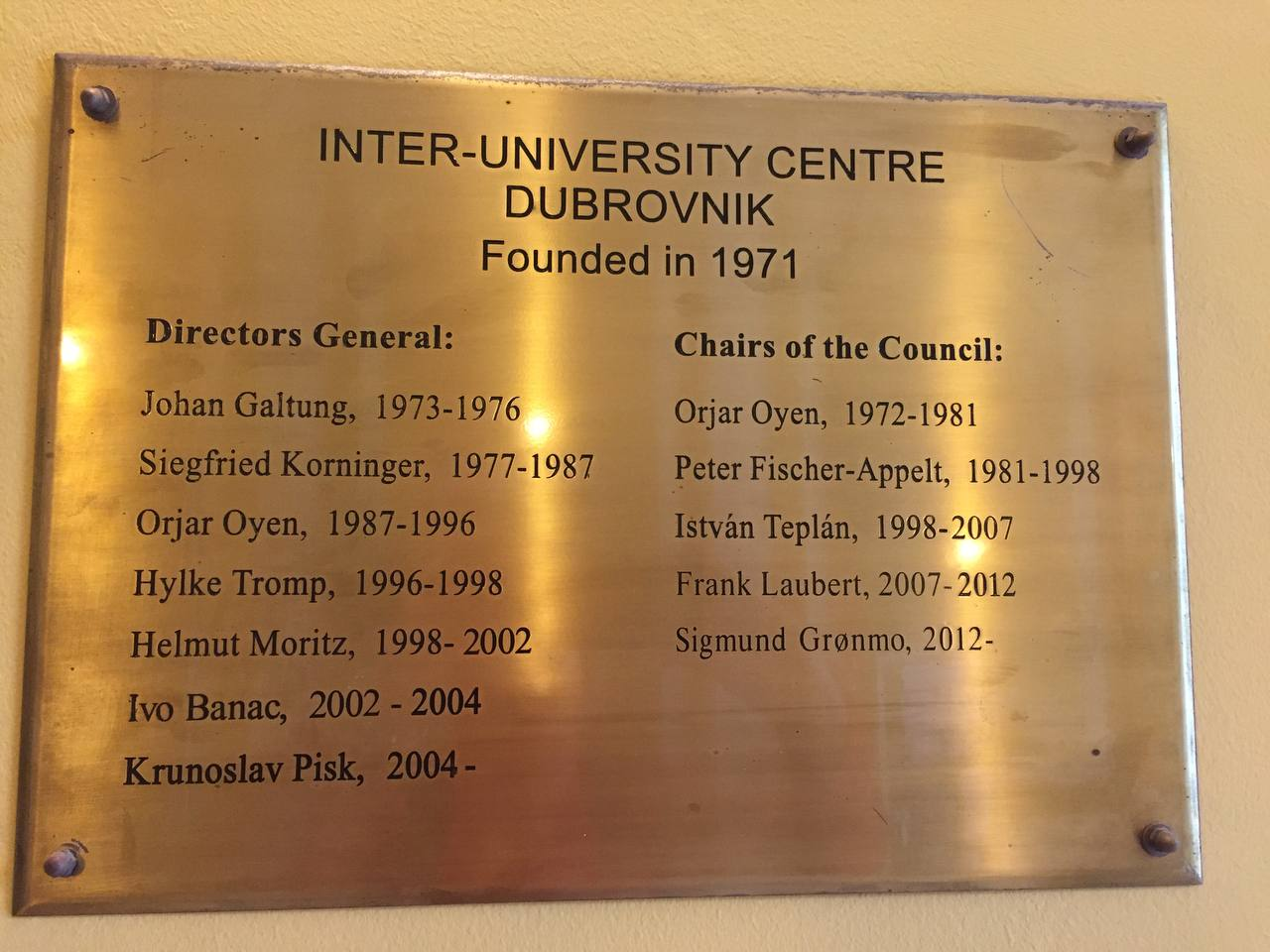
Inter-University Centre Dubrovnik. Chairs of the council.

As an educator he served on the Administrative Board of the International Association of Universities (UNESCO) between 2000 and 2008 and chaired the Council of the Inter-University Center (IUC) in Dubrovnik between 1998 and 2007.

Between 1998 and 2006 was member of the VAP program of the Salzburg Global Seminar.

He served as the Director General of the Government Center for Public Administration in Hungary which trains public servants for the Hungarian public sector and the European Union.

He was a board member of the European Institute of Public Administration, and member of the Scientific Committee of the European Senior Civil Servant project, to train the next generation of public sector leaders for the European Union.

Teplan was the chief advisor of the State Minister for Environment of Hungary. During the Hungarian Presidency of the European Union (January 1 to June 30, 2011) he was the Chair of the Council Working Party on International Environmental Issues dealing with Global and Horizontal affairs. He played a key role in Hungary's preparation for the UN Conference on Sustainable Development (UNCSD-2012). He was the founding Director General of the Hungarian National Institute for Environment. He was appointed Ministerial Envoy for the Budapest Water Summit, to be held in October 2013 in Budapest under the aegis of the UN. He was a member of the Management Board of the European Environment Agency (EEA) in Copenhagen.

He became a board member of the Regional Environmental Center for Central and Eastern Europe in 2009.

Teplan is a contributor to international conferences and journals. As a scholar he contributed to the book, Budapest and New York, Studies in Metropolitan Transformation 1870-1930

As the President of the Brussels-based PROSUM Foundation Teplán proposed the establishment of the European Public Broadcasting and News Service (EPBNS) to fight fake news and state media monopoly to safeguard reliable news for citizens. He is also member of the Consiglio Direttivo of the LINPR.

== Recognition ==
Teplan is a recipient of the Officers Cross of Merit of the Hungarian Republic.
