= European University of Social Sciences =

University association in Europe

The European University of Social Sciences
- Abbreviation: CIVICA
- Established: 2019
- Type: Education and research
- Region served: Europe
- Members: Bocconi; CEU; EUI; Hertie; IE; SNSPA; Sciences Po; SGH; SSE; LSE
- Website: www.civica.eu

The European University of Social Sciences, or CIVICA, is a university alliance of European higher education institutions specializing in the social sciences. It was established in 2019 and has been funded by the European Commission.

== History ==
Prior to its establishment, CIVICA members were closely networked, having long-held professional and institutional partnerships, materialising in dual degrees, Erasmus exchanges, and research collaborations on a bilateral basis.

Professor Simon Hix, London School of Economics' Pro Director for Research, joined partner institutions in Brussels on 7 November 2019 to officially launch CIVICA. CIVICA initially had eight schools. SGH Warsaw School of Economics (Poland) and IE University (Spain) joined it later.

== Members ==
Institution	Country	City	Founded
Hertie School	Germany	Berlin	2003
Sciences Po	France	Paris	1872
IE University	Spain	Madrid	1973
SGH Warsaw School of Economics	Poland	Warsaw	1906
Bocconi University	Italy	Milan	1902
European University Institute	Italy (Intergovernmental)	Florence	1972
Central European University	Austria	Vienna	1991
Stockholm School of Economics	Sweden	Stockholm	1909
London School of Economics and Political Science	UK	London	1895
National University of Political Studies and Public Administration	Romania	Bucharest	1991

== See also ==
- 4EU+ Alliance
