= Krzysztof Michalski =

Polish philosopher (1948–2013)

Krzysztof Michalski (8 June 1948 – 11 February 2013) was a Polish philosopher and the rector of Institut für die Wissenschaften vom Menschen (IWM) founded by him in Vienna in 1982.

== Life ==
Krzysztof Michalski was born in Warsaw. He studied philosophy at the University of Warsaw, where he received his Ph.D. in 1974 with a thesis on Heidegger and Contemporary Philosophy. In 1977, he spent one year in Germany as a Humboldt Fellow, from 1978 onwards he taught philosophy at the University of Warsaw. In 1981/82 he was a Thyssen Fellow at the Heidelberg University and in 1982/1983 a Fellow Commoner of Churchill College at Cambridge. In 1986, he was habilitated for Philosophy at the University of Warsaw with the study Logic and Time. Michalski taught philosophy at Boston University starting in 1986, and also at the University of Warsaw since 1994.

In 1982, he founded the Institute for Human Sciences (IWM) in Vienna, of which he has since been the rector. The Institute is an independent institute for advanced study in the humanities and social sciences. Since its foundation in 1982, it has promoted intellectual exchange between East and West, between academia and society, and between a variety of disciplines and schools of thought.

Ahead of the Eastern enlargement of the EU, Michalski advised the European Commission on several occasions, most notably as chairman of the Reflection Group The Spiritual and Cultural Dimension of Europe (2002–04). He is chairman of the Institute for Public Affairs in Warsaw, and president of the Network of European Institutes for Advanced Study (NetIAS).). In 2004 he was awarded the Theodor Heuss Prize.

Michalski died on February 11, 2013, aged 64, in Vienna. He is survived by his daughters, Kalina Michalska, a developmental neuroscientist at the University of California, Riverside, and Julia Michalska, a journalist and editor at The Art Newspaper in London.

== Honors ==
- 2007 Officer’s Cross of the Ordre National du Mérite (France)
- 2004 39th Theodor Heuss Prize, Stuttgart (Germany)
- 2003 Officer´s Cross of the Order of Merit of the Republic of Poland
- 1998 European Cultural Prize, Kraków
- 1994 “Man of the year” award of the Polish national daily newspaper Zycie Warszawy

== Major works ==
Monographs:

- Heidegger i filozofia współczesna (Heidegger and contemporary philosophy). Państwowy Instytut Wydawniczy, Warsaw 1978, 2nd edition 1998. Russian edition: Хайдеггер и современная философия, Territoria budushchego, Moscow 2010.
- Logika i czas. Próba analizy Husserlowskiej teorii sensu. Państwowy Instytut Wydawniczy, Warsaw 1988. English edition: Logic and Time. An Essay on Husserl’s Theory of Meaning. Kluwer Academic Publishers, Dordrecht/Boston/London 1996. Russian edition: Логика и время. Territoria budushchego, Moscow 2010.
- Zrozumieć przemijanie (Understanding Time. Selected Essays). Fundacja Augusta Hrabiego Cieszkowskiego, Warsaw 2011.
- Płomień wieczności. Eseje o myślach Fryderyka Nietzschego. Znak, Kraków 2007. English edition: The Flame of Eternity: An Interpretation of Nietzsche's Thought. Princeton University Press 2012.

As editor:

- Castelgandolfo-Gespräche (8 volumes). Klett-Cotta, Stuttgart 1985 - 1998. Polish edition: Znak and Centrum Myśli Jana Pawła, Warsaw/Kraków 2010.
- Transit – Europäische Revue (biannual journal, since 1990). Verlag Neue Kritik, Frankfurt/Main.
- Conditions of European Solidarity. Volume I: What Holds Europe Together?; volume II: Religion in the New Europe. CEU Press, Budapest/New York 2006. German edition of vol. II: Woran glaubt Europa? Religion und politische Kultur im neuen Europa. Passagen Verlag, Vienna 2007.
