= Shalini Randeria =

Indian anthropologist (born 1955)

Shalini Randeria is an American-born Indian anthropologist specializing in European colonialism and its aftermath.

== Education ==
She was born in Washington, D.C. in 1955, and brought up in Mumbai and New Delhi, Randeria is an alumna of the University of Delhi, the University of Oxford and Heidelberg University, and earned her PhD at the Free University of Berlin.

== Career ==
She is tenured as a professor of anthropology and sociology at the Graduate Institute of International and Development Studies (IHEID) in Geneva, Switzerland and appointed as the rector of the Institut für die Wissenschaften vom Menschen (IWM) in Vienna, Austria. She is also the director of the Albert Hirschman Centre on Democracy, a research centre affiliated to the Graduate Institute.

Considered as an expert on democracies, she has held various positions at the University of Zurich, LMU Munich, the Central European University, and retains the position of visiting professor at the WZB Berlin Social Science Center. She was formerly a member of the editorial board of the Annual Review of Anthropology.

In June 2021, the Central European University announced that Randeria would become the university's sixth president and rector. Randeria succeeded Michael Ignatieff and became the first woman to serve as president of the university.

In November 2024, Randeria resigned as CEU rector before the end of her term. According to media reports, she was pushed out by the board after intense internal criticism of her leadership including failing to find a campus for the university, ongoing financial troubles and closing an award-winning education program for refugees, which led to a year of protests at the university.
