= Institute for Human Sciences =

Independent institute based in Vienna, Austria

Coordinates: 48°13′37.74″N 16°21′50.94″E

The Institute for Human Sciences (German: Institut für die Wissenschaften vom Menschen, IWM) is an independent institute for advanced study in the humanities and social sciences based in Vienna, Austria.

== History and core idea ==
The IWM was founded in 1982 by the Polish philosopher Krzysztof Michalski, who was rector of the institute until his death in February 2013. From 2015 to 2022, Shalini Randeria, professor of social anthropology and sociology, was the Institute's Rector, followed by the broadcaster and journalist Misha Glenny. The IWM is committed to broaching new and often contested topics of social relevance, contributing to debates on a wide range of political, social, economic, and cultural issues. Since its inception, the IWM has promoted international exchange and dialogue among scholars and intellectuals from different fields, societies, and cultures, most notably from Eastern and Western Europe. This exchange has increasingly included researchers from North America, from South-Eastern Europe, and from post-Soviet states.

== Structure and program ==
The IWM is sustained by a community of scholars consisting of permanent fellows, visiting fellows and junior visiting fellows. Permanent fellows of the IWM are János Mátyás Kovács, member of the Institute of Economics at the Hungarian Academy of Sciences, Budapest (Hungary); Ivan Krastev, chair of the board at the Centre for Liberal Strategies, Sofia (Bulgaria); Shalini Randeria, professor of social anthropology and sociology at the Graduate Institute of International and Development Studies in Geneva; Ivan Vejvoda; Timothy D. Snyder, professor of history at Yale University (U.S.); Charles Taylor, professor emeritus of philosophy at McGill University, Montreal (Canada); and Miloš Vec, professor of European legal and constitutional history at Vienna University.

Research at the institute is focused on eight fields:

- Scales of justice and legal pluralism
- Economic ideas and institutions in Eastern Europe
- Democracy in question
- United Europe – divided history
- Religion and secularism
- The philosophical work of Jan Patočka
- International law and multinormativity
- Sources of inequality

During each year, the IWM hosts about 100 fellows and guests, including scholars as well as journalists and translators, who are awarded with fellowships to pursue their individual research while working at the Institute. The IWM regularly organizes lectures, debates, and conferences for a broad public, as well as developing policy-oriented programs. The results of this work are published in monographs, articles, and translations, as well as in the biannual journal Transit-Europäische Revue and the magazine IWMpost. The IWM is registered as a non-profit organization. It receives core funding from the Austrian government and the city of Vienna. Its projects and activities are supported by international foundations and sponsors.

== Collaborations ==
The IWM collaborates with a number of other institutions:

- Center for Urban History of East Central Europe

== Criticism ==
At the beginning of 2021, Olena Semenyaka, far-right chief ideologue and international secretary of the Ukrainian neo-Nazi National Corps party, got a six-month job as a researcher at the IWM. The university only withdrew her contract when a storm of outrage arose on social media after a photo of Semenyaka with a swastika flag and a Hitler salute had gone viral.

In spring of 2024 ERSTE Foundation withdrew its endorsement of Vienna Festival's Eine Rede an Europa / A Speech to Europe upon the invitation of Omri Boehm to speak at Judenplatz. Boehm spoke in English.

In 2025, the institute was designated as an undesirable organization in Russia.
