= Dušan Veličković =

Serbian writer and filmmaker (1947–2023)

Dušan Veličković (1947 – 5 January 2023) was a Serbian writer, journalist and filmmaker.

== Biography ==
Veličković was born in Belgrade in 1947.

Veličković was dismissed by the Yugoslav government from his post as editor-in-chief of the leading Serbian weekly NIN. Veličković's short stories, essays and reviews have been published widely both inside and outside his native Serbia. He published several books: "Images of Doubt" (interviews with European and American writers and philosophers), "Amor Mundi: Days of Bombardment and Martial Law in Belgrade, True Stories" (published in Belgrade 1999, Melbourne, Australia 2001, Barcelona, Spain 2003), "Internationale" (novel, Belgrade 2002), "Djindjic" (Belgrade 2007), "Serbia Hardcore" (Rovereto, Italy 2008, Belgrade 2009), and Bella, ciao (novel, Belgrade 2011). "Djindjic: A Face of Youth" was published in March 2013 by the Belgrade publisher Laguna, and "Balkan Pin-Up" is to be published by Italian publisher Zandonai Editore in Autumn 2013.

Veličković made two short films: Lenin on the Move (2003) and Mortal Men, Immortal Crimes (2004), as well as a feature documentary: Djindjic: A Life (2005).

Veličković received the International Award for Freedom (Premio Internazionale alla Liberta) from the Società Libera in 2009.

Veličković died in Belgrade on 5 January 2023.
