= Salka and Berthold Viertel House =

Coordinates: 34.028408°N 118.515887°W

The Salka and Berthold Viertel House at 165 North Mabery Road in Santa Monica, California, was the home of the Austrian screenwriter Salka Viertel and her husband Bertold from 1933 to 1944.

== Meeting place ==
Alongside Lion Feuchtwanger's Villa Aurora in Pacific Palisades, the Viertels' house became a meeting place for the German intellectual emigre community and members of the Exilliteratur in Los Angeles in the 1930s and 1940s.

Salka and her husband Berthold Viertel moved from Germany to Los Angeles with their three children in 1928. The couple had founded the Die Truppe theatre group in 1923, and facing financial difficulties, Berthold accepted a job to write for the couple's filmmaker friend F. W. Murnau.

Prior to their acquiring of the Mabury Road house, the Viertels had lived on Fairfax Avenue. The initial rent of the house was $900 for the first three months, then $150 after. Salka eventually purchased the house for $7,500 in 1933, its cheap price was as a result of a depressed property market in the wake of the 1933 Long Beach earthquake. Salka's salons took place on a Sunday afternoon; guests included the writers Heinrich and Thomas Mann, the playwright Bertolt Brecht, the composer Arnold Schoenberg, the filmmaker F. W. Murnau and physicist Albert Einstein. The book Jewish Women and Their Salons called Viertel's gatherings "An outpost of Mitteleuropa, with its conversational tone and home-cooked meals". Non German speaking emigre guests included the British writer Aldous Huxley, actor and filmmaker Charlie Chaplin. The English playwright and writer Christopher Isherwood lived above the Viertel's garage with his "rough trade lover" William Caskey from 1945 to 1947 before their travels in South America.

On August 1, 1943 several exiles gathered at the Viertel's house to draft a statement in support of the National Committee for a Free Germany that had been formed in Russia. A statement was eventually agreed after several hours discussion, though according to Brecht's diary, Thomas Mann later withdrew his support from it as he feared it being seen as a "stab in the back" by the Allied forces fighting Germany due to the intense patriotism of its wording.

Salka was added to an FBI Watch List in 1942, and added to an index of Communists by the American government in 1951 in the midst of the Red Scare. The Viertels divorced in 1944, Berthold moved back to Europe in 1949 and in 1953, a passport application by Salka to visit him was denied as a result of her alleged Communist sympathies. Salka eventually moved to Switzerland to live with her son, Peter, and his wife Deborah Kerr.

The Swedish actress Greta Garbo was a frequent guest and first met her lover Mercedes de Acosta at a party at the house. Salka Viertel's emigre years in California were documented in her 1969 memoir The Kindness of Strangers.

In May 2015 the house was put up for sale for $4.595 million, it was the first time the house had been for sale since the 1970s.

== See also ==
- The Thomas Mann House at 1550 San Remo Avenue, the home of fellow emigre Thomas Mann in Pacific Palisades
