= Erfurt Women Artists' Group =

- Erfurter Künstlerinnengruppe
- Formation: 1983
- Dissolved: 1994
- Purpose: arts organization for women
- Headquarters: Erfurt, Germany

The Erfurt Women Artists' Group (Erfurter Künstlerinnengruppe) was founded in 1983 by Gabriele Stötzer. It was a group of women artists in Erfurt, East Germany. They met weekly in various houses around Erfurt. They created films and fashion as well as ceramics, photographs and paintings. The group staged performances, fashion shows, and concerts.

The group changed its name to Exterra XX in 1989.

Examples of their work were included in the 2019 exhibit The Medea Insurrection: Radical Women Artists Behind the Iron Curtain at Wende Museum in Culver City, California.
