= Justinian (Justin) Jampol =

American executive (born 1978)

Justinian Jampol
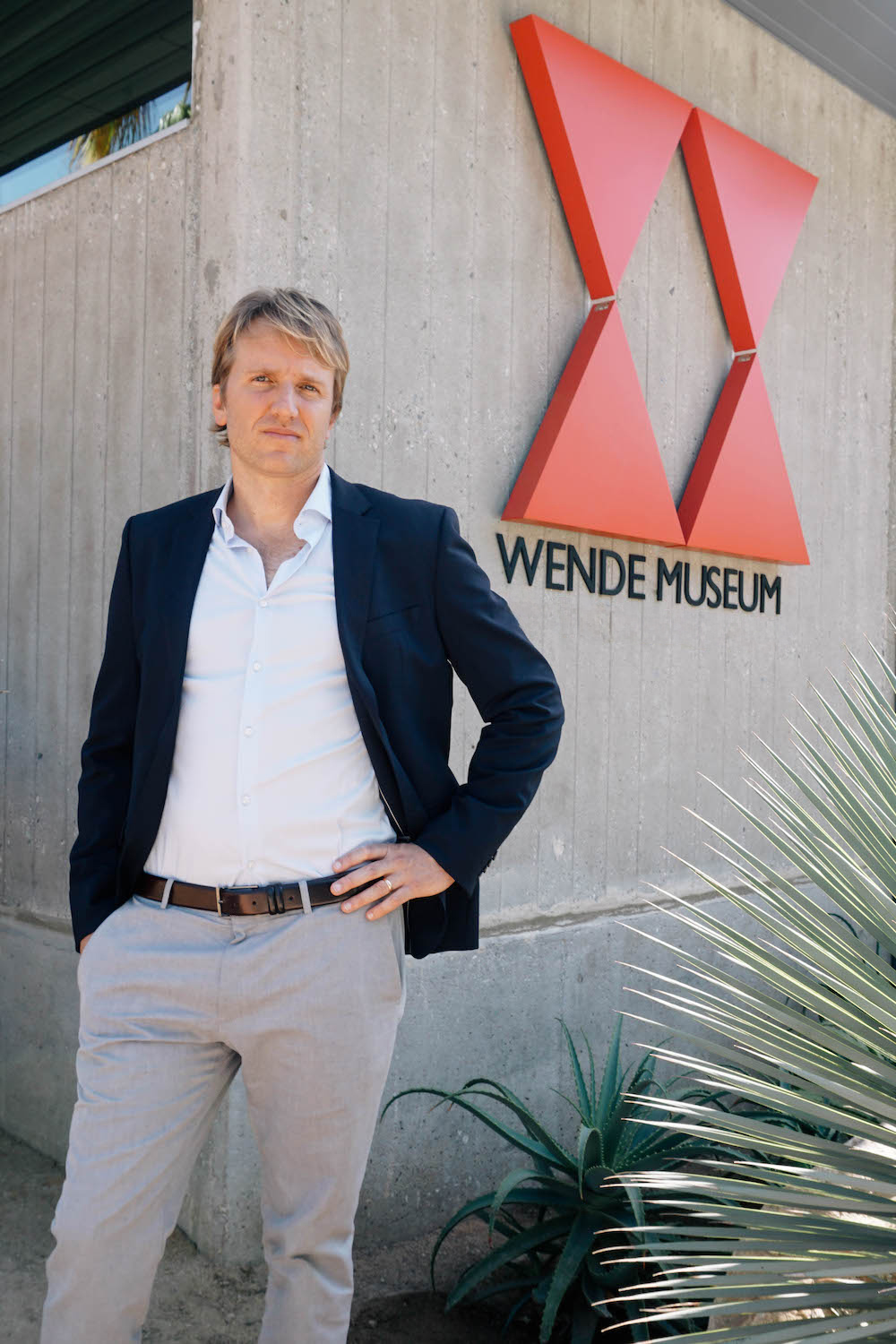
- Born: 1978 (age 47–48); Los Angeles, California, United States
- Education: University of California, Los Angeles; Oxford University
- Occupations: Founder and executive director of the wende museum of the cold war
- Spouse: Filomena Lovin

Justinian (Justin) Jampol is the founder and current executive director of the Wende Museum, an art museum, cultural center, and archive in Culver City, California. His work focuses on visual cultural studies and the connection between contemporary art and Cold War iconography. He also works as a public historian, bringing history to popular culture by hosting TV series such as the Travel Channel's Lost Secrets.

== Early life and education ==
Jampol was born in Los Angeles, California in 1978. He graduated from the University of California, Los Angeles in 2000 with a B.A. in History. Jampol attended graduate school at Oxford University, where he received a Master of Philosophy in Russian and East European Studies, and a Doctor of Philosophy in Modern History.

== Career ==
In 2002, at the age of 24, Jampol founded The Wende Museum ("Wende" is a German word that means transition or change) while studying visual culture at Oxford University. The museum now holds the largest collection of Cold War–era artifacts and artwork outside of Europe. Initially a collections-focused institution primarily accessed by researchers, under Jampol's leadership the Wende has developed into a 21st-century cultural organization that combines art and history in programming for the general public.

In 2009, in recognition of the 20th anniversary of the fall of the Berlin Wall, Jampol facilitated the placement of ten segments (24 tons) of the original Wall from Germany along Wilshire Boulevard in Los Angeles, directly across the street from LACMA. At midnight on November 9, 2009, thousands of people gathered for the installation ceremony, which was painted by graffiti artists including Shepard Fairey, Retna, Herakut, Thierry Noir, and D*Face.

In 2013, Jampol's contribution to Jeremy Deller's UK Pavilion at the Venice Biennale sparked controversy through its implication of Russian oligarchs in the corrupt process of privatization following the collapse of the USSR. In 2014, further controversy followed with the publication of a New York Times Op-ed article written by Jampol on the political crisis in Ukraine and the destruction of Soviet statues.

In 2014, Jampol co-curated Competing Utopias at the Neutra VDL House in Silver Lake, California, installing three floors of modernist Eastern Bloc design in the former home of California-based architect Richard Neutra. The show was ranked No. 3 in Hyperallergic's annual "Top Ten Exhibitions Across the United States."

As executive director of the Wende Museum, Jampol has overseen the museum's relocation in 2017 to a former United States National Guard Armory building in Culver City, and the creation of the Wende Museum's new Community Center, where the Wende and partner nonprofits offer free cultural and educational programs to the community. The Community Center was included in a 2024 list of "8 Best New Architecture Projects in L.A. for 2024." In 2026, under Jampol's leadership, the Wende announced that it was building a new archival storage and research facility in Hawthorne, California.

In January 2020, Jampol was appointed as the Los Angeles chapter president of the Heidelberg Club International. He served as chapter president until 2025, and remains on the organization's board of directors. Jampol is chairman of the board of the A-Mark Foundation, a member of the board of advisors of UCLA's Luskin Center for History and Policy, and a member of the advisory council of Villa Aurora.

In 2026, Jampol was awarded the Federal Cross of Merit by German President Frank-Walter Steinmeier for his role in saving important cultural artifacts from Villa Aurora during the 2025 Palisades Fire. The rescued objects included a portrait of Marta Feuchtwanger and a parchment scroll recounting the biblical story of Queen Esther.

He is listed as a "Notable Alumnus" of UCLA.

== Film and TV production ==
Jampol has produced several films about the Cold War and is a frequent guest on various Travel Channel programs, including Hotel Secrets & Legends (2014) and Mysteries at the Museum (2014).

From 2015 to 2018, he was a guest historian on the Cooking Channel program Food: Fact or Fiction? narrated by Michael McKean.

Jampol was the host and consulting producer of the Travel Channel program Lost Secrets, a six-part series that premiered on November 10, 2019.

He was an executive producer of Red Elvis: The Cold War Cowboy (2022). During its festival run, the documentary received an IndieFEST Film Award Award of Excellence Special Mention (Documentary Feature), an IndieFEST Award of Excellence for Direction, an Oniros Film Award for Best Documentary Feature, and a Florence Film Award Honorable Mention (Feature).

== Publications ==
Jampol's writing has been featured in The Atlantic, Foreign Policy, Frankfurter Allgemeine Zeitung, Los Angeles Times, The New York Times, and The Times of London.

In 2014, Jampol published a 904-page encyclopedia of the Wende Museum's East German collection titled Beyond the Wall: Art and Artifacts from the GDR. The book was produced by Benedikt Taschen and published by Taschen Books. It was reviewed positively in the New York Times Sunday Book Review. The book was launched on November 9, 2014, to coincide with the 25th anniversary of the fall of the Berlin Wall. In 2019, a smaller second edition of the book, The East German Handbook, was published with text in both English and German.

In 2015, Jampol guest-edited a special supplement of The Art Newspaper on Los Angeles art.

== Personal life ==
Jampol is married to actress and Wilhelmina model, Filomena Lovin. His brother-in-law is Australian tennis professional Mark Philippoussis.
