= Villa Aurora =

House in Los Angeles, California

Coordinates: 34°02′47″N 118°33′22″W

The Villa Aurora, 520 Paseo Miramar, Pacific Palisades, Los Angeles, has been an artists' residence since 1995. It is the former home of the German Jewish author Lion Feuchtwanger and his wife Marta. The Feuchtwangers bought this Spanish-style mansion in 1943. The house was a popular meeting place for artists and the community of German-speaking émigrés. Lion Feuchtwanger wrote six of his historical novels in this house: The Day Will Come, Proud Destiny, The Jewess of Toledo, Tis folly to be wise, Jephthah and his Daughter, and This is the Hour.

Today, the villa is operated by two institutions: the Villa Aurora & Thomas Mann House e.V., situated in Berlin, and the Friends of Villa Aurora Inc. in Los Angeles. It offers fellowships for artists-in-residence to stay at the villa, for German-based writers, visual artists, composers, and filmmakers.

== Construction ==
Villa Aurora was part of a building project initiated by Arthur Weber and George Ley in cooperation with the Los Angeles Times, which reported routinely on the construction of this "demonstration house". Weber hired architect Mark Daniels and interior designer Rodney Benso. The house pipe organ was built by Santa Monica Artcraft. The wood for the ceilings was brought in from Spain and the fountains came from Italy. When Villa Aurora was finished in 1928, it featured the latest technological inventions and novelties in domestic design such as an electric garage openers, a dishwasher, a fridge and a gas range. Due to the depression, it was not sold, and the developer Weber and his family were forced to move in themselves in 1931. Financial problems forced Weber to leave the house in 1939 and the property sat idle.

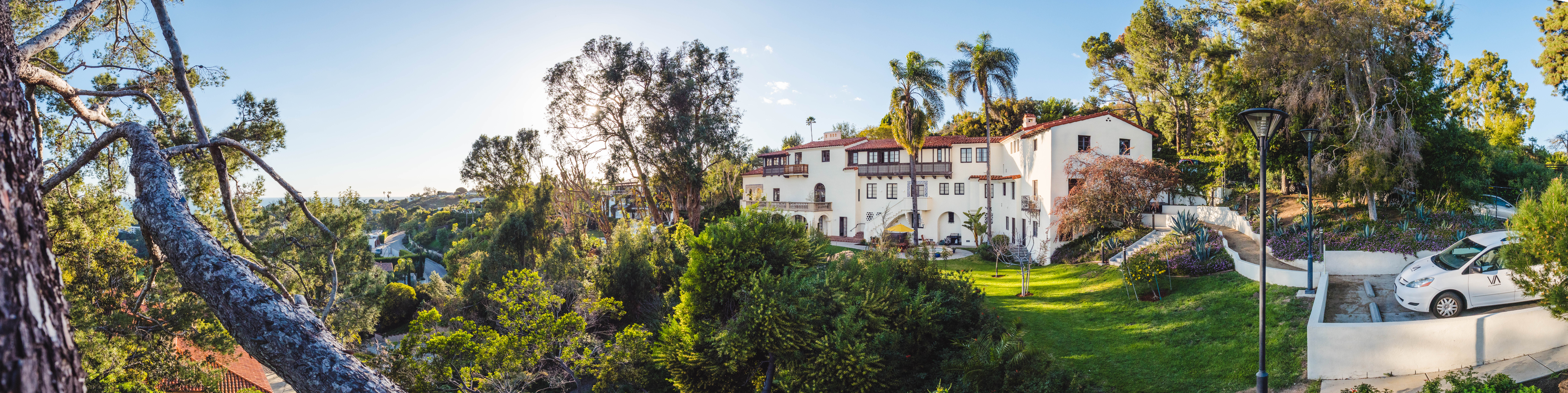
Villa Aurora in 2017

== The Feuchtwangers ==
In 1941, Lion Feuchtwanger and his wife Marta arrived in Los Angeles via New York and Mexico after having escaped from the South of France. Lion Feuchtwanger liked the solitude for his work and the decision to purchase the house came easily. Here, Feuchtwanger created his third library. Marta bought the used furniture and took care of the garden. While Lion used to buy books whenever there was money to spend, Marta bought plants and created a huge garden, which was over time diminished in size through landslides.

During the war the Villa became a meeting place for fellow émigrés, just as Salka and Berthold Viertel's house in Santa Monica. Prominent members of the German emigre community who would meet at the houses included Thomas and Heinrich Mann, Arnold Schoenberg, Vicki Baum, Bruno Frank, Ludwig Marcuse, Franz Werfel and Bertolt Brecht, as well as other European expatriates like Charlie Chaplin and Charles Laughton.

After Lion's death in 1958 the house was left to the University of Southern California with the stipulation that Marta would be allowed to stay for the remainder of her life and was made the caretaker of the library, which had grown to 30,000 volumes. At present the Villa is still home to 22,000 books, with the most valuable copies having been moved to the USC Feuchtwanger Memorial Library.

== Artists-in-residence ==
Marta Feuchtwanger lived at Villa Aurora until her death in 1987. After Marta's death the University of Southern California was looking to sell the property. The sale of the dilapidated Villa seemed imminent and USC professor Harold von Hofe asked the journalist and Feuchtwanger biographer Volker Skierka to launch an initiative to save the Villa Aurora. He also won the support of many public figures in politics and the media, such as the former head of the publishing house Rowohlt, Fritz J. Raddatz, and member of the German parliament, Freimut Duve. The goal was to create a "Villa Massimo on the Pacific" modeled after the artists residency Villa Massimo in Rome. In order to preserve the house as the only existing monument to European and German exiles to the West Coast of the United States, the association "Friends and Supporters of Villa Aurora" was founded in Berlin. The non-profit organization secured public funding from the German Federal Foreign Office, the Berlin Senate, the Berlin Lottery Foundation and the Tagesspiegel Foundation and was able to purchase and renovate the house. Frank Dimster, FAIA, restored the house and received the City of Los Angeles Historic Preservation Award in 1996.

The Feuchtwanger House was landmarked as one of the Los Angeles Historic-Cultural Monuments and also by the Pacific Palisades Historical Society. The historic organ that in addition to Marta Feuchtwanger, Bruno Walter, Ernst Toch and Hanns Eisler had played on, was restored in 2010. The historic furniture, including the beds of Marta and Lion, and their desks and chairs, are still on the premises.

Villa Aurora serves as an artists' retreat offering residency fellowships for German-based writers, visual artists, composers, and filmmakers.The villa is still owned by the Berlin-based non-profit, but is funded by the German Federal Foreign Office and the Federal Government Commissioner for Culture and the Media. In 2015, filmmaker Edward Berger was awarded a fellowship to spend six months at Villa Aurora.

Together with the USC Feuchtwanger Memorial Library, the organization awards an annual Feuchtwanger Fellowship to artists who are persecuted in their home countries in memory of the history of German emigration in the 1930s.

Sponsors and private donations further help to maintain the historic property. The Villa stands as a reminder of German exile in the United States and is a memorial to German-Exile-Culture and the persecution of the German Jews. Villa Aurora is a place for cultural encounters, creative debates and joint projects. Since 1995 around 300 artists have enlivened this place and have themselves been inspired by U.S. culture and the exiles' traces.

The Villa Aurora Forum in Berlin organizes the meetings of the selection committees which choose the fellows of Villa Aurora. The Forum also presents the results of the artists' works to the German public through exhibitions, screenings, readings, concerts and the publishing of editions. At the annual 'Villa Aurora Nacht' in Berlin, the newly chosen fellows are presented along with the work of the ones from the previous year.

== 2025 Palisades Fire ==
The Palisades Fire reached the grounds of Villa Aurora on January 7, 2025. Staff removed a small group of objects before evacuating, and the house survived but suffered heavy smoke and soot damage. While the area was still closed, Justin Jampol, founder of the Wende Museum, organized the removal of artworks and Feuchtwanger family belongings from Villa Aurora and the Thomas Mann House, and the Wende kept a 1932 portrait of Marta Feuchtwanger until the house reopened on August 30, 2026. In October 2026, Jampol received the Federal Cross of Merit from Germany, in part for this work.

== Berlin office ==
The Villa Aurora is operated by two institutions: the Villa Aurora & Thomas Mann House e.V., situated in Berlin, and the Friends of Villa Aurora Inc., in Los Angeles. In addition to administering the selection of grant recipients and the organization's overall funding, the Berlin Office produces programs and publications featuring alumni presenting results of their stays in Los Angeles to the German public.

The Berlin office also develops programs focused on current transatlantic debates as well as the history of exile. Regular events include both an annual reception, which brings future fellows and alumni together with representatives from culture, politics, media, the sciences and humanities, as well as the commemoration of the Burning of the Books on May 10, 1933.

The office is situated at the Berlin-Brandenburg Academy of Sciences and Humanities on Gendarmenmarkt. Once a year, the organization arranges meetings of the juries responsible for selecting artists for the Villa Aurora Fellowships and intellectuals addressing fundamental issues for the Thomas Mann Fellowships. Experts choose recipients for the subsequent year from applicants. For those selected, the Berlin office is the first point of contact: It is where they outline their projects and plans and work with the Berlin team to initiate contacts with partners in Los Angeles.

Together with Reporters Without Borders and the University of Southern California's Feuchtwanger Memorial Library, Villa Aurora and Thomas Mann House e.V. grants its annual Feuchtwanger Fellowship to a writer or journalist committed to human rights or facing censorship and persecution in their home countries. Additionally, the Berlin team, in cooperation with a partner institution, invites an artist from Los Angeles to Berlin to foster sustainable cultural exchange with Villa Aurora and Thomas Mann House alumni.

== Checkpoint California ==
On the occasion of the 20th anniversary of the Villa Aurora as an institution for cultural exchange in the US, the event Checkpoint California took place at the Deutsche Bank KunstHalle. Between June 12 and 28, 2015, Villa Aurora Fellows (e.g. Dietrich Brüggemann, Stefan Kriekhaus, Uljana Wolf, Heinz Emigholz, Rosa von Praunheim, Steven Warwick, Veronika Kellndorfer, Steve Rowell, Felicitas Hoppe) presented their work, gave lectures and talked about their current projects. During the last day, moderator Jörg Heiser led a panel with future Villa Aurora fellow Susan Philipsz and former fellow Christian Jankowski. Checkpoint California ended with a performance by Matan Zamir, Nicola Mascia, Claudia De Serpa Soares and Jeff Wood.

== Fellows ==
Past fellows of the artist-in-residence program include:

- Maren Ade, 2012
- Peter Ablinger, 2001
- Wolfgang Becker, 2000
- Edward Berger, 2015
- Vajiko Chachkhiani, 2019
- Irene Dische, 1997
- Gerald Eckert, 2010
- Jochen Alexander Freydank, 2010
- Stefan Goldmann, 2017
- Durs Grünbein, 1997
- Helene Hegemann, 2011
- Thomas Hettche, 2002
- Christoph Hochhäusler, 2005
- Felicitas Hoppe, 2012
- Lorenz Kienzle, 2024
- Kemal Kurt, 1999
- Philipp Lachenmann, 2003
- Michael Lentz, 2001
- Klaus Modick, 2009
- Heiner Müller, 1995
- Carsten Nicolai, 2004
- Marc Sabat, 2010
- Said, 2010
- Judith Schalansky, 2010
- Hannes Stöhr, 2006
- Thomas Struth, 2013
- Yoko Tawada, 1997
- Ilija Trojanow, 2006
- Rosa von Praunheim, 1998
- Sasha Waltz, 2015
- Hendrik Weber, 2014
- André Werner, 2000
- Haegue Yang, 2017

== See also ==
- Thomas Mann House, Pacific Palisades
