= Ludwig Feuchtwanger =

German lawyer and lecturer (1885–1947)

Ludwig Feuchtwanger (28 November 1885 – 14 July 1947) was a German lawyer, lecturer, publisher and author.

== Life ==
Feuchtwanger's ancestors originated from the Franconian city of Feuchtwangen, which, following a pogrom in 1555, expelled all its resident Jews. Some of the expellees subsequently settled in Fürth, where they were called the Feuchtwangers, meaning "those from Feuchtwangen." Feuchtwanger's grandfather Elkan moved to Munich in the middle of 19th century.

Ludwig Feuchtwanger was born in 1885 to Orthodox Jewish margarine manufacturer Sigmund Feuchtwanger and his wife Johanna née Bodenheim. He was the second son in a family of nine siblings. He was the younger brother of Lion Feuchtwanger, a German-Jewish novelist and playwright. He and his brother Martin became authors.

Ludwig lived in a home on Grillparzer Strasse, and was a neighbor of Adolf Hitler. After Kristallnacht in 1938, following brief incarceration in Dachau, Ludwig escaped to England. His son is the London-based historian Edgar Feuchtwanger. Two of his sisters settled in Palestine following the rise of the Nazi Party, one was killed in a concentration camp, and one sister settled in New York City.

== Published works ==
- Briefwechsel 1918 - 1935 - Published by Duncker & Humblot (30 September 2007)
