= Katy Derbyshire =

German to English translator and writer

Katy Derbyshire is a British-born, Berlin-based translator and writer. Among the authors she has translated are: Clemens Meyer, Christa Wolf, Inka Parei, Helene Hegemann, Simon Urban, Rusalka Reh, Yangzom Brauen, Tilman Rammstedt, Francis Nenik, and Dorothee Elmiger.

Her translation of Bricks and Mortar by Clemens Meyer was long-listed for the 2017 Man Booker Prize and won the 2018 Straelener Prize for Translation. Derbyshire has also served on the jury of Germany's Internationaler Literaturpreis and the International Dublin Literary Award.

In addition, Derbyshire was instrumental in establishing the Warwick Prize for Women in Translation, awarded annually since 2017. She has also been a vocal supporter of the Women in Translation movement and the creation of Women in Translation Month.
