= JR Davidson =

American architect

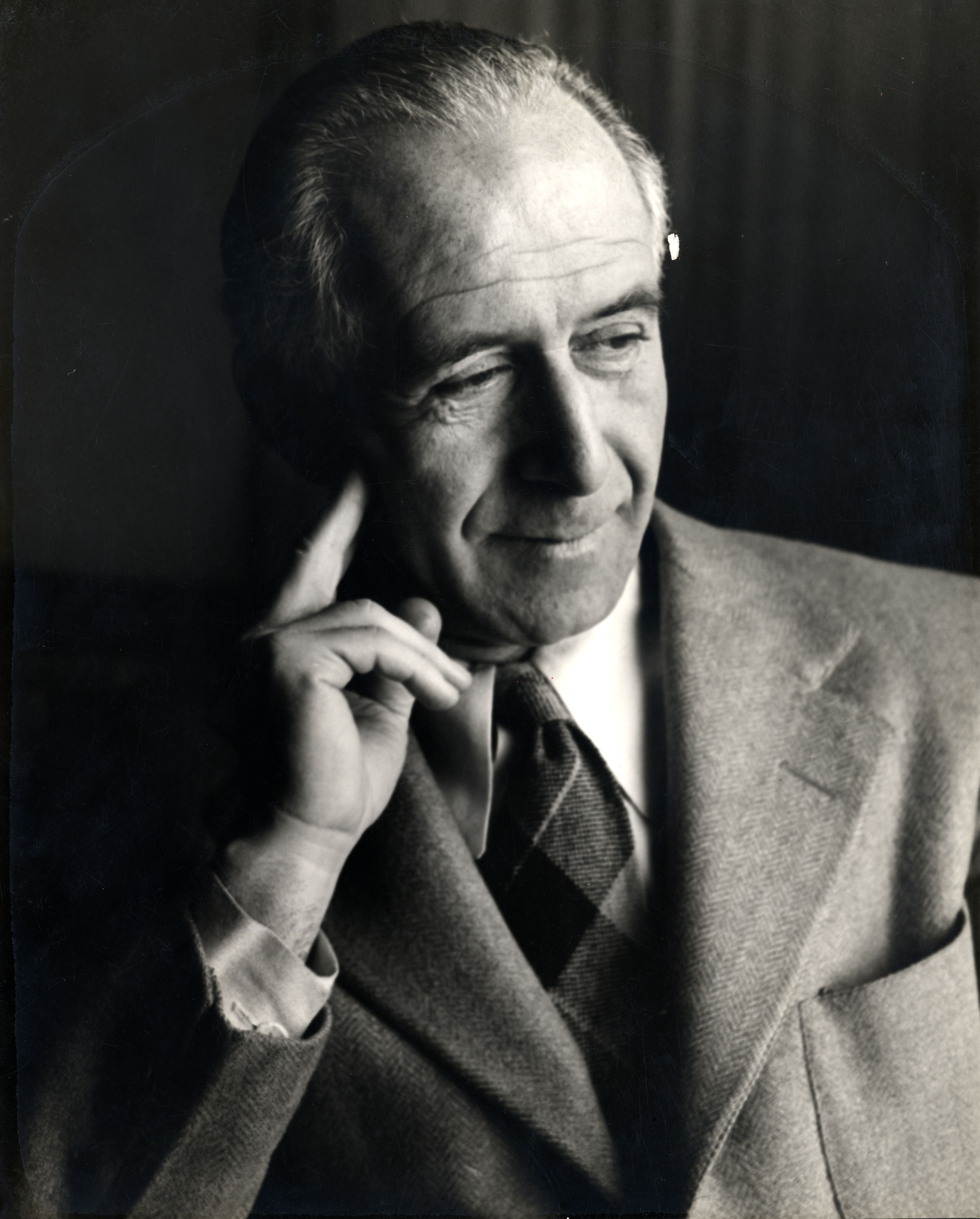
Davidson c. 1945

Julius Ralph Davidson or JR Davidson (February 7, 1889 – May 2, 1977) was a Mid-century modern American architect known for advancing modern architecture in Los Angeles and participating in Arts & Architecture magazine's Case Study House Program.

Davidson was part of a group of Jewish architects who sought refuge in Los Angeles after having to flee Europe due to persecution inflicted by the Nazis including the Holocaust. This group included Richard Neutra, Rudolph Schindler, Kem Weber, and Paul László who furthered modern architecture in Los Angeles in the 1930s and 40s. Architectural historians and critics have described Davidson as being conversant in and talented at bridging both Art Deco, International, and Modernist styles. His modern interiors have been noted for their warmth, fluidity, and well-planned storage space. Writer Thomas Mann, who had an aversion to glass-box styles, selected Davidson as the architect of his Pacific Palisades home for his moderate modernism.

== Life and work ==
Julius Ralph Davidson was born to a Jewish family in Berlin, Germany in 1889. After spending several years in London working for the office of Frank Stewart Murray and in Paris, JR Davidson married Greta Wollstein in 1914. He served in World War I for two-and-a-half years beginning in 1915. After the war, he returned to Berlin and later moved to Los Angeles in 1923, where he worked for architect Robert D. Faquhar, Cecil B. DeMille, and developers Hite-Bilike before moving to Chicago in 1933, where he remodeled hotel interiors. He returned to Los Angeles in 1936 and would remain in Southern California for the rest of his life. Most of his commissions after 1936 were residential. In 1938, he began teaching at Art Center College of Design. He retired in 1972 and died in Ojai, California in 1977. JR Davidson donated his papers to the Architecture and Design Collection at the University of California, Santa Barbara in 1972 and 1975.

His realized work was extensively photographed by Julius Shulman.

== Commercial retail environments ==
In 1932 Davidson designed the receding window front of the Lora Lee shop on 6560 Hollywood Boulevard. Davidson's receding window shopping passage designs had previously been published in the Architectural Record. Davidson's designs for commercial retail environments are also noted for their lighting and a seating island placed centrally in the room. Davidson also worked on assignments to remodel restaurants and cafes.

== Case Study House Program ==
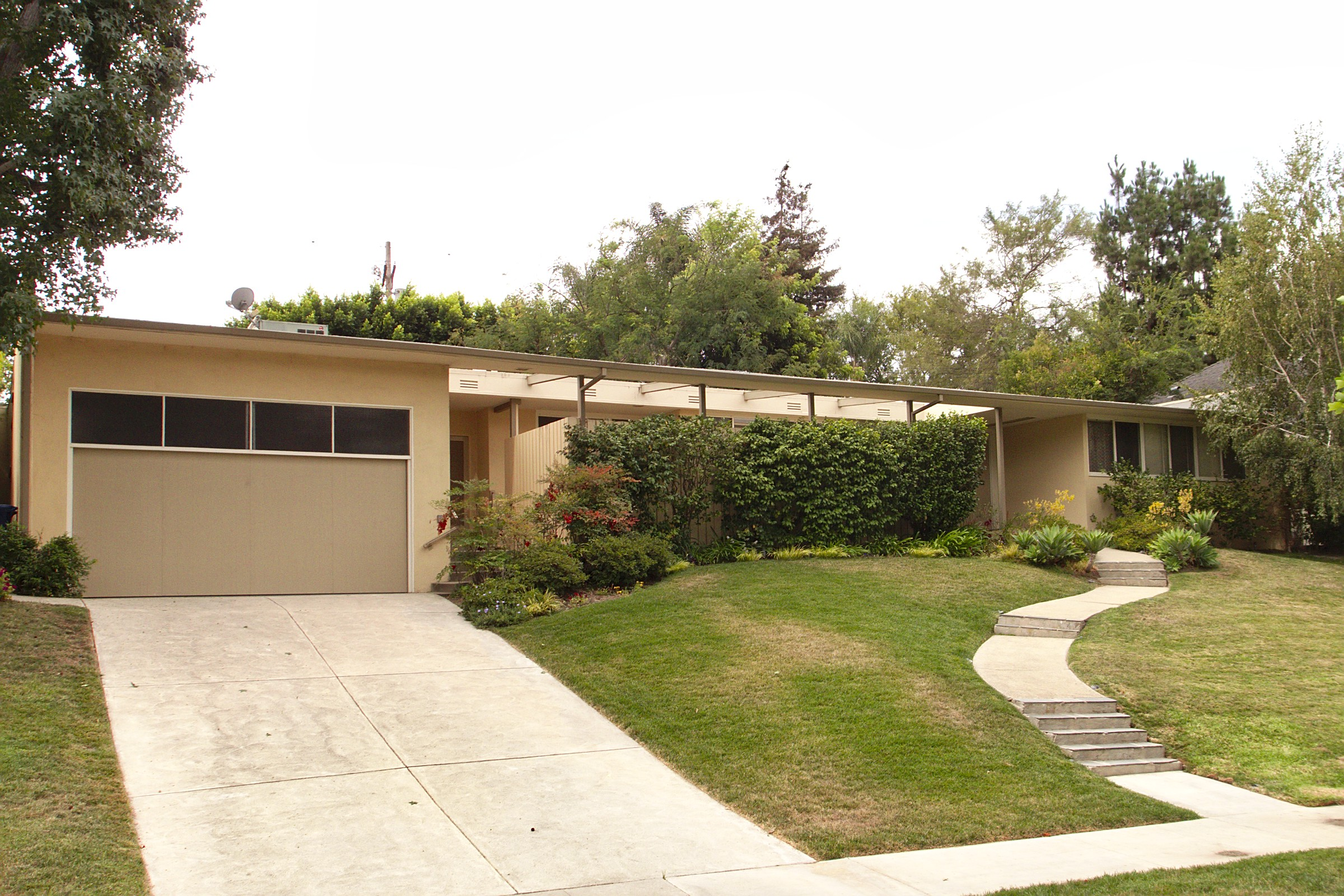
Case Study House No. 1

In the announcement for the Case Study House Program, Arts & Architecture magazine recognized Davidson's work as the first modern designs for stores, restaurants, offices, and single and multiple residential units in Los Angeles and Chicago. Davidson designed Case Study Houses #1, #2, #11, and #15. House #11 in West Los Angeles was the first to be built and the first to be demolished. House #1 is located at 10152 Toluca Lake Avenue in the Los Angeles neighborhood of Toluca Lake. The only other house besides the Toluca Lake house that is still extant is Case Study House #15 located in La Canada Flintridge, California.

== Selected projects ==
Project	Date	Address	Location	Notes
Redesign of Cocoanut Grove nightclub interiors. Ambassador Hotel	1926	3400 Wilshire Blvd.	Los Angeles	Demolished
Facades and interiors for Wilshire Boulevard shops (includes Hi-Hat Restaurant, later Perino's #1)	1929	3927 Wilshire Blvd.	Los Angeles	Demolished
Sardi's remodel	1931	6313 Hollywood Blvd.	Los Angeles	Demolished
Maitland House remodel	1937	230 Strada Corta	Bel-Air	
Stohart-Phillips House	1938	2501 La Mesa Drive	Santa Monica	
Gretna Green Apartments	1940	12209 Dunoon Lane	Brentwood	Aka Drucker Apts.
Sabsay House	1940	2351 Silver Ridge Road	Silver Lake	
Thomas Mann House	1941	1550 San Remo Drive	Pacific Palisades	Remodeled
Case Study House #11	1946	540 South Barrington Avenue	West Los Angeles	Demolished
Kingsley House	1947	1620 N. Amalfi	Pacific Palisades	
JR Davidson House and Office	1947	548 So. Barrington Ave.	West Los Angeles	Demolished
Case Study House #1	1947	10152 Toluca Lake Ave	North Hollywood	Aka McFadden House
Case Study House #15	1947–1948	4755 Lasheart Drive	La Cañada Flintridge	Remodeled
Osherenko House	1948–1949, 1954		Beverly Hills	
Rabinowitz House	1957	2262 N. Stradella	Bel-Air	
Jokl House	1958	563 N. Bundy	West Los Angeles	Demolished
