= The Oppermanns =

1933 novel by Lion Feuchtwanger

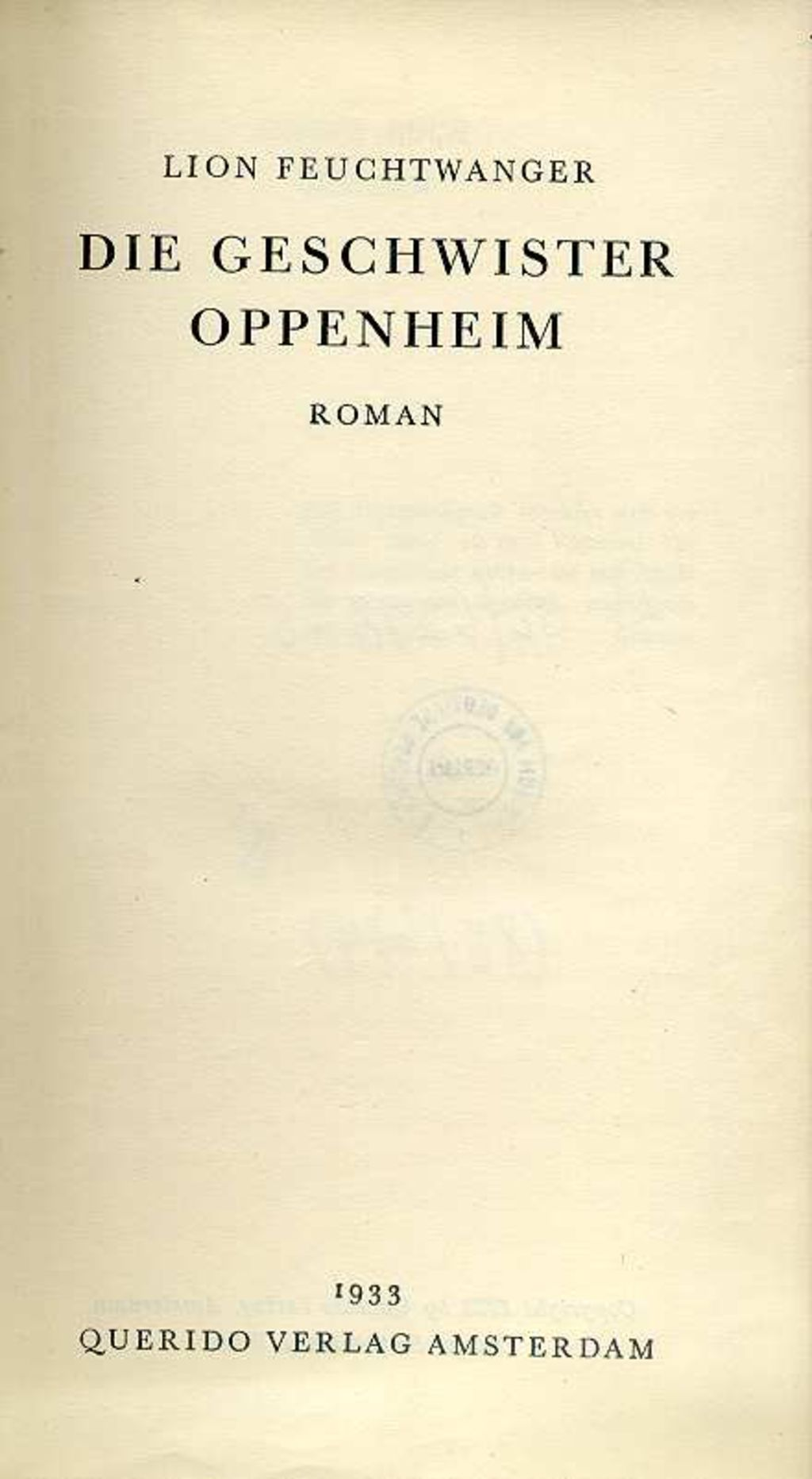
- In the first edition of the novel (1933), the name of the family was changed into Oppenheim
- Author: Lion Feuchtwanger
- Original title: Die Geschwister Oppermann
- Translator: James Cleugh
- Language: German
- Series: Wartesaal
- Genre: Political novel, family saga
- Publisher: Querido Verlag
- Publication date: 1933
- Publication place: Germany / France / Netherlands
- OCLC: 774592110
- Preceded by: Success (1930)
- Followed by: Exil (1940)

The Oppermanns (German: Die Geschwister Oppermann) is a 1933 novel by Lion Feuchtwanger. It is the second novel in his Wartesaal ("The Waiting Room") trilogy, which tells about the rise of Nazism in Germany; the first part of the trilogy is Success (1930) and the last is Exil (1940). In the same year when the novel was written, in 1933, the Nazis fully came into power, and the author published the novel while already in exile.

== Background ==
The novel was written while the Nazis were coming into power in the Weimar Republic; it was completed in 1933, the same year Adolf Hitler became chancellor.

Feuchtwanger, a German Jew who was already well known for his criticism of the NSDAP, that year was stripped of his citizenship, his property in Berlin was seized, his works were included in the lists of "Un-German" literature that was burned in May, and he was forever banned from publishing in the newly established Third Reich. The Oppermanns was first printed by the Dutch Querido Verlag, when the author was already in exile in France. Feuchtwanger was writing about the events he was experiencing and only lightly fictionalizing them.

In the first edition, the surname was changed from Oppermann to Oppenheim, and the title was changed to Die Geschwister Oppenheim; the surname was corrected in later editions and translations. According to Maik Grote, this happened because when the novel was about to be printed, Feuchtwanger's brother received a threatening letter, in which a professor whose name was also Oppermann, also an SA leader, wrote that there had never been a Jewish family with that surname, and that he could prove that by his genealogy which goes back to the 13th century. Feuchtwanger informed Querido about the letter and asked to change the surname.

The book was based on research that Feuchtwanger wrote for a screenplay, on which he was working with the British screenwriter Sidney Gilliat. Although the project was commissioned by the Prime Minister Ramsay MacDonald, it was never completed as MacDonald and his government decided upon a course of appeasement of Nazism and Fascism after Hitler's seizure of power. Feuchtwanger began reworking the screenplay in April 1933 and had the novel finished by October.

== Plot ==
The Oppermanns is a family saga that chronicles the fall of a bourgeois German Jewish furniture company under the rise of Nazism.

In "time immemorial", Emmanuel Oppermann, a merchant who moves to Berlin, supplies the Prussian Army and starts the Oppermann furniture company. The main characters are his grandson Gustav Oppermann, a writer who is working on a biography of Gotthold Lessing, and his brothers Martin - owner of the family furniture business, and Edgar - a well-known doctor. The story takes place between November 1932, when Gustav turns 50 years old, and the late summer of 1933. While the Nazis are quickly establishing their dictatorship, many Germans that do not share their views, as well as some Jews, insist that things will eventually turn around and thus prefer to wait passively or ignore what is happening around them.

Edgar, a successful doctor at a Berlin hospital, faces an antisemitic public smear-campaign and is later removed from the hospital by the Sturmabteilung. Martin, the head of the Oppermann family business, is forced to merge it with an "Aryan" German partner.

Meanwhile, Martin's 17-year-old son Berthold is expelled from his soccer club despite his talent for the sport, and in class, he is abused by a Nazi teacher for refusing to express his loyalty to the new regime - eventually leading to his suicide.

Gustav decides to leave Germany and move to Switzerland, but later comes back under a false passport to become an anti-Nazi political activist and to document Nazi crimes. He is arrested and sent to a concentration camp, although he is eventually released.

== Reception ==
The first German-language publication of The Oppermanns sold approximately 20,000 copies. Overall, the book sold approximately 250,000 copies worldwide, and was translated into over 10 languages. A few months after the first publication, the novel was translated into English and released in the United States. Fred T. March wrote in 1934 in The New York Times that the novel "is addressed to the German people, who will not be allowed to read it, urging them to open their eyes. And it is addressed to the world outside bearing the message, 'Wake up! The barbarians are upon us.'"

Klaus Mann later praised the novel as the "most striking, most widely read narrative description of the calamity that descended over Germany." In 1983, Frederick S. Roffman said of the novel in The New York Times that since Hitler's rise to power, no other "historical or fictional work has more tellingly or insightfully depicted the relentless disintegration of German humanism."

In 2018, Deutsche Welle placed the book in their "100 German Must-Reads" list and wrote that today it is "considered one of the most important literary works documenting the downfall of a democracy" and became "Feutchwanger's most recognized novel".

Roffman noted that Feuchtwanger's novels remained popular in German-speaking countries after the 1950s, but not in English-speaking ones. In 2020 the novel was re-discovered by publisher Persephone Books and re-printed in English, with a revised translation, for the first time since the 1930s. Two years later, publisher McNally Editions issued an American edition with an introduction by Joshua Cohen, an adapted version of which was published as an essay in The New York Times. While Pamela Paul appreciated the novel for its description of the mass psychology and 'the misbegotten assumptions' that helped the Nazis to establish their dictatorship, Cohen praises the novel as "one of the last masterpieces of German Jewish culture" and also notes the lack of its popularity in the English-speaking countries:

Given that Feuchtwanger's books were so explicitly and accessibly addressed to a general audience, it's poignant that he has none now. His novels go unread; his plays go unperformed; he's a first-class writer without a first-class berth; a classic firebrand without a canon.

In contrast to Paul's essay, Gal Beckerman wrote in The Atlantic in December 2022: "Feuchtwanger himself doesn't seem to be offering a template for how democracy dies. If anything, in his novel, templates shatter easily and quickly. For all the lessons he is trying to impart in 1933, there is no clearer answer about when exactly it’s time to go, when holding on to dignity becomes self-indulgent and dangerous. What remains instead is a deep sense of that rumbling "elemental force," and the impossible choices should you find yourself stuck in its path."

== Style and themes ==
In the essay published in The New York Times, Cohen notes that the style of the novel differs with "quick-cuts and montage sequences". He also writes that one of the central themes of the novel is built around the phrase "It is upon us to begin the work. It is not upon us to complete it", derived by Feuchtwanger from "It is not your duty to finish the work, but neither are you free to neglect it", a phrase, attributed to Tarfon in Talmud. He also thinks that the novel "raises salient questions about the relationship between art and politics", as Feuchtwanger while writing the novel followed "the socialist-realist principle", according to which art can "have a message" and participate in political life, and that Feuchtwanger "expected his work not just to be something, but to do something", unlike many other German-language writers and writers of the United States, where this principle was dismissed.

Beckerman in his essay defines the central conflict of the novel as the conflict of dignity of an individual and the external "common sense". In his opinion, this conflict is represented in the fates of Martin and Berthold.

== English translation ==
The novel was first translated into English by James Cleugh in 1933 as The Oppermanns. In 2020, the translation was revised by Persephone Books.

== Adaptations ==
In 1938, a film adaptation under the title The Oppenheim Family was made by the Soviet film director Grigori Roshal. It was released in May 1939 in the United States.

In 1983, the novel was turned into a TV film by the West German film director Egon Monk.
