= Edgar Feuchtwanger =

German-British historian (1924–2025)

Edgar Feuchtwanger OBE
- Born: 28 September 1924; Munich, Weimar Republic
- Died: 22 August 2025 (aged 100); Winchester, England, UK
- Citizenship: German; British
- Spouse: Primrose Essame (m. 1962; died 2012)
- Children: 3
- Parent: Ludwig Feuchtwanger (father)
- Relatives: Lion Feuchtwanger (uncle)
- Awards: Federal Cross of Merit (2003)

Academic background
- Education: Magdalene College (PhD)

Academic work
- Discipline: History
- Sub-discipline: German, British
- Institutions: University of Southampton
- Notable works: Hitler, My Neighbor (2017)

Edgar Joseph Feuchtwanger OBE (28 September 1924 – 22 August 2025) was a German-British historian.

== Life and work ==
Feuchtwanger was born in Munich, Bavaria, then Weimar Republic. He was the son of Erna Rosina (née Rheinstrom) and lawyer, lecturer, and author Ludwig Feuchtwanger, and a nephew of novelist and playwright Lion Feuchtwanger, who was a vocal critic of Hitler and the Nazis. His family is Jewish. As a child, he lived with his family in Munich on Grillparzerstraße 38, near the private residence of Adolf Hitler on Prinzregentenplatz 16. From 1935 to 1938, he attended the Maximiliansgymnasium in his hometown.

Feuchtwanger was 14 when the Gestapo arrested his father on 10 November 1938, part of the coordinated pogrom known as Kristallnacht, which included the detentions of 30,000 Jews in Germany and Austria, the deaths of 91, and the widespread ransacking of Jewish-owned stores and synagogues. Edgar's father Ludwig was then imprisoned at the Dachau concentration camp, and 14-year-old Edgar's sense of security crumbled.

When his father was released six weeks later, the family considered relocation options. They dismissed Palestine and Prague, and ultimately managed to obtain entry visas to Britain. On 19 February 1939, Edgar boarded a train bound for London. His father accompanied him as far as the Danish border, and then returned to Germany to finish arrangements for him and his wife to follow. In May of that year, the family was re-united in England. From 1944 to 1947, Edgar studied at Magdalene College in Cambridge, where he received his doctorate in 1958. From 1959, he taught history at the University of Southampton, until he retired in 1989. In 2003, he was awarded the German Federal Cross of Merit.

In 2012, Feuchtwanger co-authored a book with French journalist Bertil Scali describing his childhood brushes with Hitler entitled Hitler, mon voisin: Souvenirs d'un enfant juif. It was published in English in the US as Hitler, My Neighbor in 2017. Feuchtwanger has also published an autobiography describing his experiences during the "Third Reich" and the post-war years, entitled I Was Hitler's Neighbour, in 2015.

Feuchtwanger was appointed Officer of the Order of the British Empire (OBE) in the 2021 New Year Honours for services to Anglo-German understanding and history. Feuchtwanger was married to Primrose Essame from 1962 until her death in 2012 and had three children. He died in Winchester, England on 22 August 2025, at the age of 100.

== Published works ==
- Disraeli, Democracy and the Tory Party. Oxford University Press, 1968.
- Prussia: Myth and Reality. Oswald Wolff Limited, 1970.
- Upheaval and Continuity: A Century of German History. London: Wolf, 1973.
- Gladstone. Macmillan, 1975.
- The Soviet Union and the Third World. Macmillan, 1981 (with Peter Nailor).
- Democracy and Empire: Britain, 1865–1914. Edward Arnold, 1985.
- From Weimar to Hitler: Germany, 1918–33. Palgrave Macmillan, 1993 (2nd revised edition, 1995).
- Disraeli. Bloomsbury USA, 2000.
- Imperial Germany 1850–1918. Routledge, 2001.
- Bismarck. Routledge, 2002. Second edition: Routledge, 2014.
- Albert and Victoria. Hambledon Continuum, 2007.
- Hitler, mon voisin: Souvenirs d'un enfant juif (with Bertil Scali). Éditions Michel Lafon, 2013 (in French).
- Hitler, My Neighbor (with Bertil Scali). New York: Other Press, 2017.
- Kinderbriefe aus dem Exil: Edgar Feuchtwanger in England 1939 (with Antonia Cox, ed. Anja Tuckermann). Berlin: Duncker & Humblot, 2024.
