= Francis Nenik =

German farmer and writer

Francis Nenik is a German farmer who writes in his free time. He has published several novels. Current works include XO (a novel in the form of a loose-leaf collection) as well as a collection of short stories with strict alliteration (2013).

His most recent work is The Marvel of Biographical Bookkeeping, which explores the life stories of Nicholas Moore and Ivan Blatný, two 20th-century poets whose stars burned bright in their youths, Moore in England and Blatný in Czechoslovakia. Later in their lives both men were battered by history and individual fate. The book's imaginative structures are built on detailed research, and as the two men's separate, parallel existences unfold, they reveal astounding coincidences and heartbreaking reversals of fortune.

An English translation of his story "Joseph and I" was published in the Spring 2013 issue of Mad Hatters' Review. Words Without Borders called him "a comic genius, a master of dialogue and invention who finds humor in the darkest of places and darkness in the midst of jokes."

In 2014, he started writing a series of political short stories.

In 2016, Fiktion.cc published Neniks novel "Coin-Operated History". Spector Books published a selection of Neniks literary essays, called "Doppelte Biografieführung".

On January 20, 2017, he began his "Diary of a Derelict", which addresses the presidency of Donald Trump.

In 2018 his book "Reise durch ein tragikomisches Jahrhundert" was published. It gained positive reviews. The Times Literary Supplement praised the punchy prose and declared, "The resulting book is a triumph of reportage over commentary. The book was nominated for the "hotlist" of outstanding books produced by independent publishers in Switzerland, Austria and Germany. The book was translated into English and published under the title "Journey through a Tragicomic Century. The Absurd Life of Hasso Grabner" (2020). In the accompanying trailer, actor Tom Wlaschiha reads from the book.

"Seven Palms" (2018) deals with the Thomas Mann House in Pacific Palisades, Los Angeles. In it, Nenik reconstructs in detail for the first time the history of the house in which the writer Thomas Mann lived with his family in American exile between 1942 and 1952. The book was well received by critics. The Süddeutsche Zeitung compared it to Nenik's novel biography Reise durch ein tragikomisches Jahrhundert and described both as "amazing books".

"Seven Palms" was translated into English in 2021. The book was slightly revised and supplemented for this purpose, for example to include the work of photographer Kurt Hielscher. Nenik shows how his pictures of Spain and Italy, published in the early 1920s, shaped the American idea of (southern) Europe. The area around Pacific Palisades, where Thomas Mann and many other emigrants later lived, was developed in the late 1920s by landscape developer and architect Frank Meline and called the Californian Riviera. Hielscher's paintings were an important influence for Meline, who sold the building land to Thomas Mann in 1940 and shortly afterwards also produced his own (unrealised) design for the house.

Nenik was also involved as a collaborator in the publication of "Calendar of Failure" (2018), published by Nico Semsrott.

In 2019, Nenik published the first German translation of a poem by Ashraf Fayadh, a poet imprisoned in Saudi Arabia.

In January 2021, Audible Germany released the podcast "Schauergeschichte", written by Nenik and narrated by actor Nic Romm, which explores the origins, spread and impact of collective fears from the Enlightenment to the 20th century. The podcast is based on extensive research and reached #1 on the bestseller list. Season 2 of the podcast was released in August 2021. Season 3 started in April 2022.

In April 2021, Nenik's "Diary of a Derelict" was published by Matthes & Seitz. In more than 1,000 pages, Nenik analyses the political, social and cultural changes in the USA during Donald Trump's reign. The Leipziger Zeitung said the book was "crammed with astounding figures and insights". The author thereby "spreads out his findings before the eyes of the readers with heartfelt joy [...] and always finds the punchline, the wicked joke in the matter."

Also in 2021, Nenik's novel "E. or The Island" was published, which deals with the German euthanasia program during the Nazi era. It is written from the perpetrator's perspective. Deutschlandfunk praised the book's "immense artistry" and "daring" and compared it to Marcel Beyer's novel "Flying Foxes" (1996) and Jonathan Littell's "The Kindly Ones" (2006). Die Zeit called the novel "brilliant" and the Frankfurter Allgemeine Zeitung declared that Nenik "creates his sparks from the combination of detective, almost obsessive archival and reading work with an insatiable artistic delight in language" and found the book to be "also linguistically, decidedly refined". The book was a success and Nenik was awarded the Anna Seghers Prize in November 2021.

In October 2023, Audible published "Zwischen Heilkunst und Horror", a history of modern medicine. Based on extensive research, in it Nenik recounts the development of medicine from 1800 onward "as an often maddening sequence of discoveries and aberrations, chance and luck."

Also in October 2023, Audible released the 1st season of "The History of Fear," the English translation of Nenik's "SchauerGeschichte". The audiobook is narrated by actress Ellen Pompeo (Grey's Anatomy).

== Works ==
=== Books ===
- XO, ed[ition]. cetera, Leipzig, 2012. (A novel in the form of a loose-leaf collection). - The book online (Published under a CC license)
- Ach, bald crashen die Entrechteten furchtlos gemeingefährliche, hoheitliche Institutionen, jagen kriegserfahrene Leutnants mit Nachtsichtgeräten oder parlieren querbeet Russisch, Swahili, Türkisch und Vietnamesisch, während Xanthippe Yamswurzeln züchtet, ed[ition]. cetera, Leipzig, 2013. (A book with stories in strict alliteration, illustrated by Halina Kirschner), Sample Free audiobook
- Doppelte Biografieführung, Spector Books, Leipzig, 2016.
- Münzgesteuerte Geschichte, (Novel), Fiktion.cc, Berlin, 2016. online.
- Coin-Operated History, (Novel), transl. Amanda DeMarco, Fiktion.cc, Berlin, 2016. Fiktion.
- Reise durch ein tragikomisches Jahrhundert. Das irrwitzige Leben des Hasso Grabner. Voland & Quist, Dresden/Leipzig 2018.

=== Stories/Essays (in German) ===
- Sich frei publizieren, Fiktion, April 2016, Berlin. online.
- Hymne auf einen amerikanischen Eiergroßhändler, in: Edit 66, Frühjahr 2015, S. 60-69 and bilingual (English/German) in: Words Without Borders. Translated by Amanda DeMarco, July 2015.
- Unglaubliche wiewohl nicht weniger wahrhafte Geschichten aus einem freien Land. (Political Short Stories)
- Zu Tode gelebt. Die Geschichte des Edward Vincent Swart (Literary Essay), in: Merkur. Deutsche Zeitschrift für Europäisches Denken, Heft April 2014, S. 319–327.
- Geschichten aus der Geschichte der Zukunft der Literatur, in: Neue Rundschau, Heft 1/2014, S. 14–25.
- Joseph und ich. . (Story. Radio reading)
- Joseph und ich In: Edit 61, Frühjahr 2013, reprinted in: Daniel Tyradellis/Ellen Blumenstein (Ed.): Friendly Fire and Forget, Matthes & Seitz, Berlin 2015.
- Report 23/02/2013. (A story to mark Chelsea Manning's 1000 days in prison.)
- Wie Hunter Mayhem nach Uruguay reiste. (A short story)
- Vom Wunder der doppelten Biografieführung. (Literary Essay) in: Edit 59, Sommer 2012. "Radio reading"
- Theorie der sekundären Primärverwertung.

=== English Translations ===
- Journey through a Tragicomic Century. The Absurd Life of Hasso Grabner. Translated by Katy Derbyshire, V&Q Books, Berlin 2020, ISBN 9783863912574.
- Seven Palms. The Thomas Mann House in Pacific Palisades, Los Angeles. Translated by Jan Caspers, Spector Books, Leipzig, 2021 ISBN 9783959053358.
- The Scarred Tissue of a Ship's Hull. Translated by Katy Derbyshire, in: Brixton Review of Books 12/2020, p. 16–18.
- Diary of a Derelict. Translated by Paul Noske, Leipzig 2017.
- The Marvel of Biographical Bookkeeping. Translated by Katy Derbyshire. Readux Books, 2013, Sample
- How Hunter Mayhem traveled to Uruguay. Translated by Bradley Schmidt. No Man's Land # 8, Winter 2013.
- Joseph and I. Translated by Bradley Schmidt. Mad Hatters' Review, 2013.
- In Praise of an American Egg Wholesaler. Translated by Amanda DeMarco, Words Without Borders, July 2015.
- Coin-operated History (Novel), Translated by Amanda DeMarco, Fiktion, Berlin, 2016. online.
- Publish and be Free (Essay on publishing with an open license and Creative Commons), Fiktion, Berlin, April 2016. online.
- Burning bright, Burning out. The Story of Poet and Anti-Apartheid Activist Edward Vincent Swart. Translated by Anna Aitken, in: Transition-Magazine 119 (April 2016), S. 155–167.
