= Thomas Mann House =

House in Los Angeles, California

Coordinates: 34°03′32″N 118°29′58″W

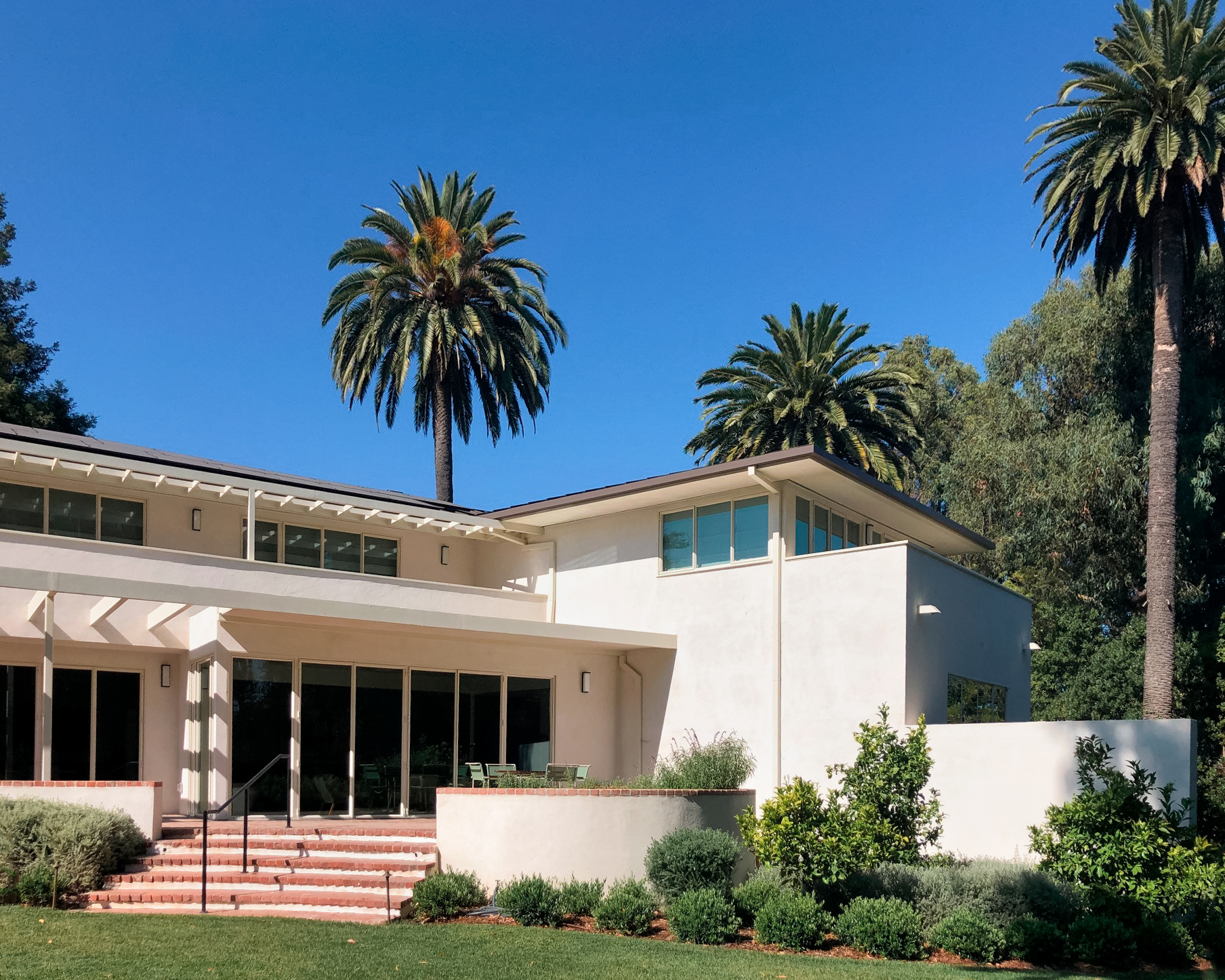
Thomas Mann House, Pacific Palisades, Los Angeles, 2020

The Thomas Mann House (Thomas-Mann-Haus) is located in the Pacific Palisades neighborhood of Los Angeles, California, US. It was the residence of Nobel Prize laureate Thomas Mann and his family during his exile from 1942 until 1952. Designed by the architect Julius Ralph Davidson, the house at 1550 San Remo Drive was built in 1941/42. In 2016, it was acquired by the German federal government, and opened on June 18, 2018, as a place for transatlantic dialogue and debate.

== History ==
The Thomas Mann House is in the Riviera neighborhood of Pacific Palisades, a community in the Westside of Los Angeles. During the Nazi era, some German Jews fleeing persecution and the Holocaust found refuge in California, and especially the Pacific Palisades area became a refuge and a center for German Jewish culture, and was home to many artists, writers, and intellectuals, as well as others. Pacific Palisades is also home to the Villa Aurora, the residence of Jewish refugee Lion Feuchtwanger and his wife since 1943.

While staying in the Brentwood neighborhood in the summer of 1940, Thomas and his Jewish wife Katia Mann decided to move to California. In 1941, they rented a house above Santa Monica Canyon. That same year, they bought a 1.5-acre (0.61 ha) property in the neighboring community of Pacific Palisades, which was part of a lemon plantation. They had also been offered today's Villa Aurora, but they wanted a new building, smaller and cozier.

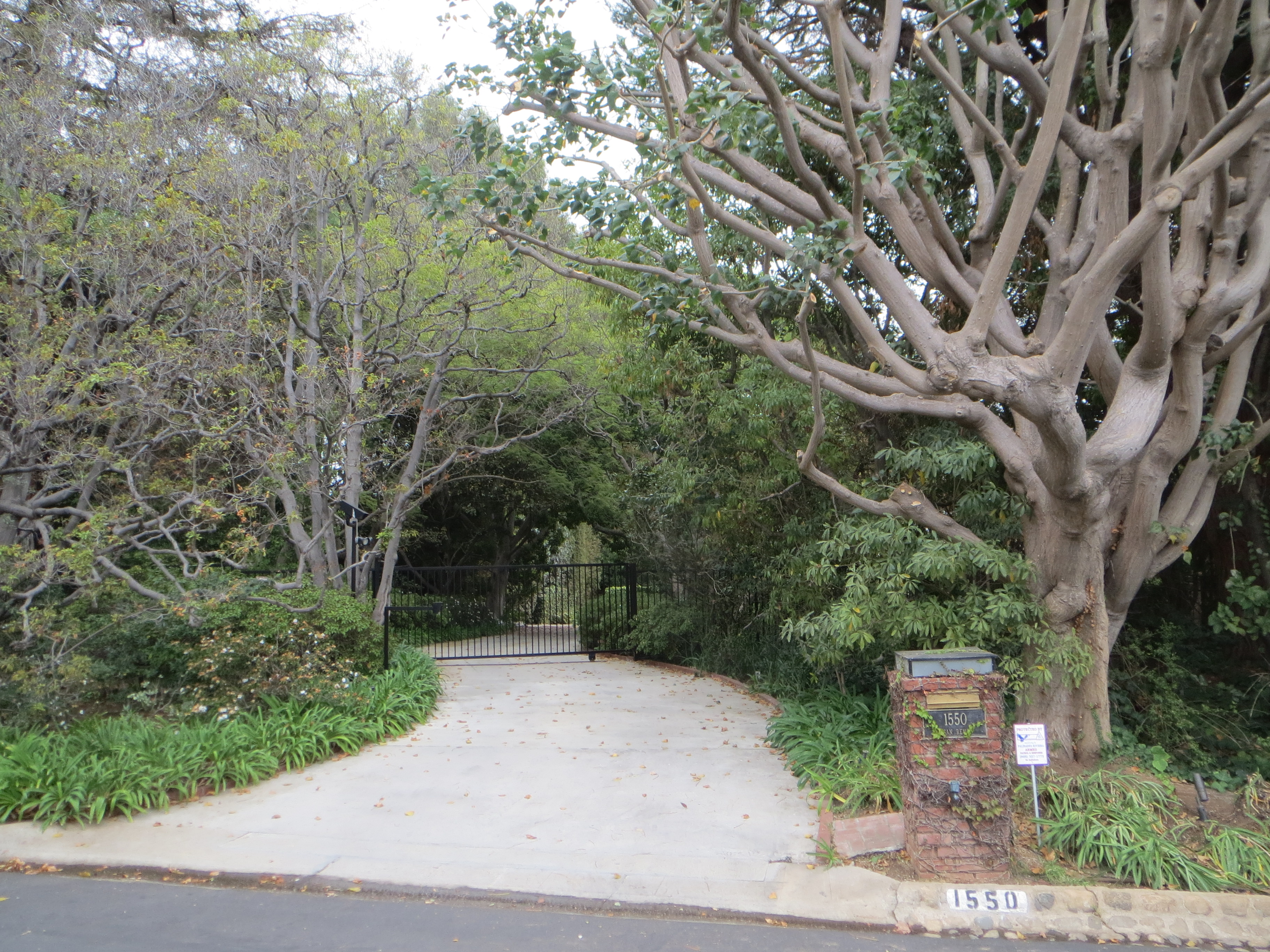
Driveway, 2014

=== Planning and construction phase ===
The architectural design of the house proved to be difficult. Although Thomas Mann knew the architect Richard Neutra personally (Neutra had accompanied Mann on an architectural tour of Los Angeles in 1938 and shown him some of his buildings) he decided not to work with him. Mann did not like Neutra's modernist architecture, which he called, in his diary, "[c]ubist glass-box style". At a party given by Vicki Baum in April 1938, which was also attended by Neutra, Mann tried to get rid of the architect by remarking to another guest: "Get that Neutra off my back." Thomas Mann also failed to reach an agreement with the architect Paul László, and in October 1940 he rejected the designs by architect Frank Meline. Erika Mann's suggestion to hire the architect Paul Lester Wiener too was soon abandoned.

In late 1940, Mann hired the architect Julius Ralph Davidson, who submitted the first designs on January 4, 1941. The construction was made possible by Mann's profitable honorary post as "Consultant in Germanic Literature" at the Library of Congress – an appointment that he had received in 1941 thanks to his long-term correspondent and sponsor Agnes E. Meyer – as well as by his lucrative lecture tours. Meyer also acted as surety for the mortgage.

The two-story villa was built between June 1941 and February 1942 at a cost of US$30,000. The sum is a matter of concern since Mann, in April 1941, had thought Davidson's plans for a 30,000-dollar house to be too expensive. Reviewing the construction bills, Francis Nenik calculated the total construction cost to amount to about US$26,000.

The construction work was done by the German émigré Ernst Moritz Schlesinger. The building plans were revised several times; the house was made smaller and plans to build an annex above the garage and a chimney in Thomas Mann's study were dropped. The elongated building's living space was just under 4,300 sq. ft., designed in the so-called International Style. The interior was designed by the interior architect Paul Huldschinsky who had emigrated from Berlin. Rooms on the ground floor included Thomas Mann's study, whose wood paneling and book shelves are still preserved, and the living room with its glass-fronted view to the garden. On the first floor, several smaller rooms served as bedrooms for Thomas and Katia Mann and their children. Since 1948, their daughter Erika Mann also lived in the house.

"In the different contributions Davidson and Huldschinsky made to the design of Thomas Mann's house in Pacific Palisades, there were two principles of exile at work: In the architecture, the adaptation to the new Californian world; in the interior design, the attempt to rescue what was lost, however incompletely. Here assimilation, there reconstruction," notes journalist Heinrich Wefing.

=== Life at the Villa ===
Thomas Mann named the house and the entire property "Seven Palms" after the seven palms planted on the grounds. The Manns also worked with an émigré when it came to designing the garden. In 1942, Theodor Löwenstein, born in Battenfeld and emigrated to the United States in 1931, designed the garden for US$1,100. Besides working as a gardener, Löwenstein also served as president of the German Jewish Club of 1933 between 1936 and 1938.

Thomas Mann wrote some of this most important works while living at the house, including his novel Doctor Faustus, large parts of the fourth volume of his tetralogy Joseph and His Brothers, and numerous political speeches and writings expressing his opposition to the German National Socialist regime, including most of his radio broadcasts Deutsche Hörer! (Listen, Germany!).

Disappointed by American post-war politics and McCarthyism, Thomas and Katia Mann, together with their daughter Erika, left the house in July 1952 and returned to Switzerland where they had previously lived in exile between 1933 and 1938. Worried about his reputation in the United States, Mann on November 7, 1952, wrote to Agnes E. Meyer from Zurich that he wanted to sell the house in California; he did not want to leave the impression, however, that he had turned his back on America. He would remain an "American citizen", he wrote. Living in Erlenbach, Switzerland, under cramped circumstances, complaining that the study would not even accommodate a sofa, he wrote to Agnes E. Meyer in September 1953 that he missed his California home. He never again saw the villa, "that home which I have come to love".

In September 1953, the American lawyer Chet Lappen and his wife Jon bought the house for US$50,000. The family added additions and an outdoor swimming pool and lived at the property until 2010.

=== Purchase by the German Federal Government ===
In the summer of 2016, the building was put up for sale, without any mention of its prominent former owners. The villa was in danger of being demolished. Herta Müller, fellow Nobel Laureate in Literature, and other writers warned of the potential loss of an important place of German exile literature. Politicians, including State Minister for Culture Monika Grütters and Foreign Minister Frank-Walter Steinmeier, embraced the idea of transforming the residence into a place of remembrance and encounter. In November 2016, the German federal government bought the house for approx. US$13 million.

The reconstruction, which cost some US$5 million, began in 2017. The building was fully refurbished. The floor plan remained the same, as did Thomas Mann's study and parts of the kitchen. In July 2018, the German news magazine Der Spiegel reported behind-the-scenes trouble in connection with the house and the academic program.

On June 18, 2018, the Thomas Mann House was opened by Federal President Frank-Walter Steinmeier. The opening took place during the presidency of Donald Trump, a time of tensions in U.S.-German relations. In his inauguration speech, Steinmeier said: “The struggle for democracy and for a free and open society is what will continue to unite us, the United States and Germany.” The opening was also attended by Katia and Thomas Mann's grandson Frido Mann, who had spent parts of his childhood at the house. The house survived the Palisades Fire in January 2025, but the fire forced the house to close for several months.

== Management ==
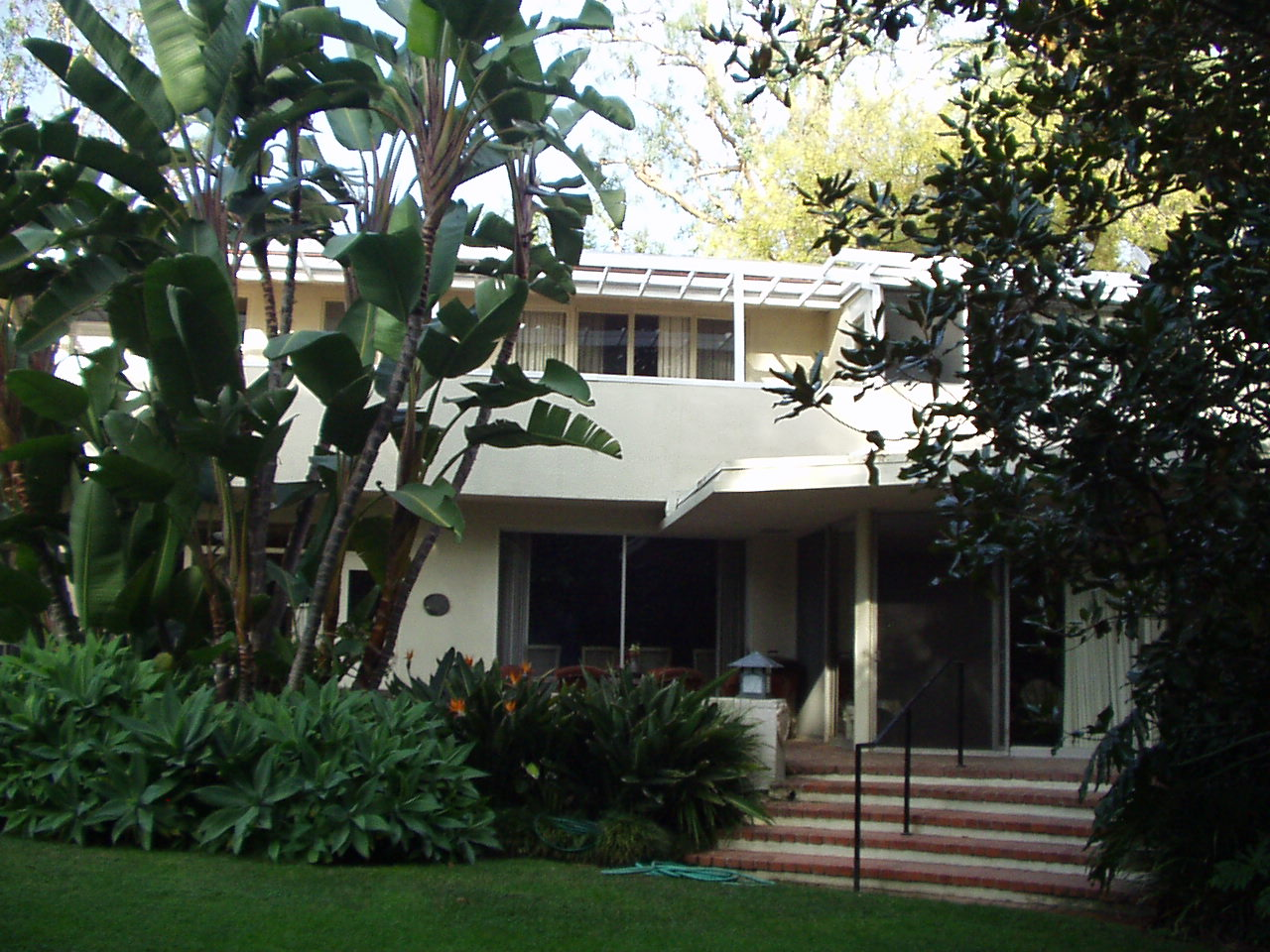
Front of the home

The Thomas Mann House is funded by the Federal Foreign Office, the Federal Government Commissioner for Culture and the Media, and private foundations. The Villa Aurora & Thomas Mann House e.V. is responsible for planning the program of the Thomas Mann House. The house offers a residency program for up to five Fellows simultaneously. The main building is able to accommodate four Fellows, while a fifth can stay in a new building next to the swimming pool. The fellowships, with a monthly stipend of €3,500, are funded by the Bosch Stiftung and the Berthold Leibinger Stiftung as well as the Krupp-Stiftung. The goal is to offer an opportunity for dialogue and exchange among each other and with the host country about the big issues of our time".

In May 2022, Benno Herz succeeded Dr. Nikolai Blaumer as the new program director. In April 2023, the team expanded to include Dr. Oliver Hartmann as the new director of the Thomas Mann House.

=== Program highlights ===
Since the opening of the house in June 2018, a variety of programs have been developed first under program director Nikolai Blaumer, since 2022 under Blaumer's successor Benno Herz: conferences, readings, concerts, and discussion events that, based on the Fellows' research projects, are held in cooperation with various partner institutions in the United States and in Germany. Besides academic discourses, the program increasingly engages with cultural and political issues.

The program of the Thomas Mann House kicked off with a conference on The Struggle for Democracy on June 19, 2018. The conference was opened with a keynote speech by Frank-Walter Steinmeier.

The 2019 program included a multi-day conference entitled Moral Code – Ethics in the Digital Age, which took place at the University of California, Los Angeles. Fellow Damian Borth joined American scholars for a discussion about new ways of communicating and the ethical implications of the use of digital technologies.

In cooperation with the German radio broadcaster Deutschlandfunk and the German daily Süddeutsche Zeitung, the Thomas Mann House in October 2019 launched the series 55 Voices for Democracy. This series of lectures is inspired by the 55 BBC radio broadcasts that Thomas Mann recorded at the house during the Second World War for listeners in Germany, Switzerland, Sweden, the occupied Netherlands and Czechoslovakia. Renowned international intellectuals, scholars, and artists will broadcast talks from the Thomas Mann House, presenting their ideas for the revival of democracy. Contributors include political scientist Francis Fukuyama, sociologists Ananya Roy, Andreas Reckwitz, and Jutta Allmendinger, German literary scholar Jan Philipp Reemtsma, the American writer Alexandra Kleeman, the political scientist Jan-Werner Müller, as well as the historians Timothy Snyder. In April 2020, the Thomas Mann House together with the S. Fischer Verlag, launched the online reading initiative #MutuallyMann. Participants of the communal reading of Thomas Mann's novella Mario and the Magician included well-known journalists, writers, and scholars.
