= Case Study House No. 1 =

Historic house in California, United States

- U.S. National Register of Historic Places
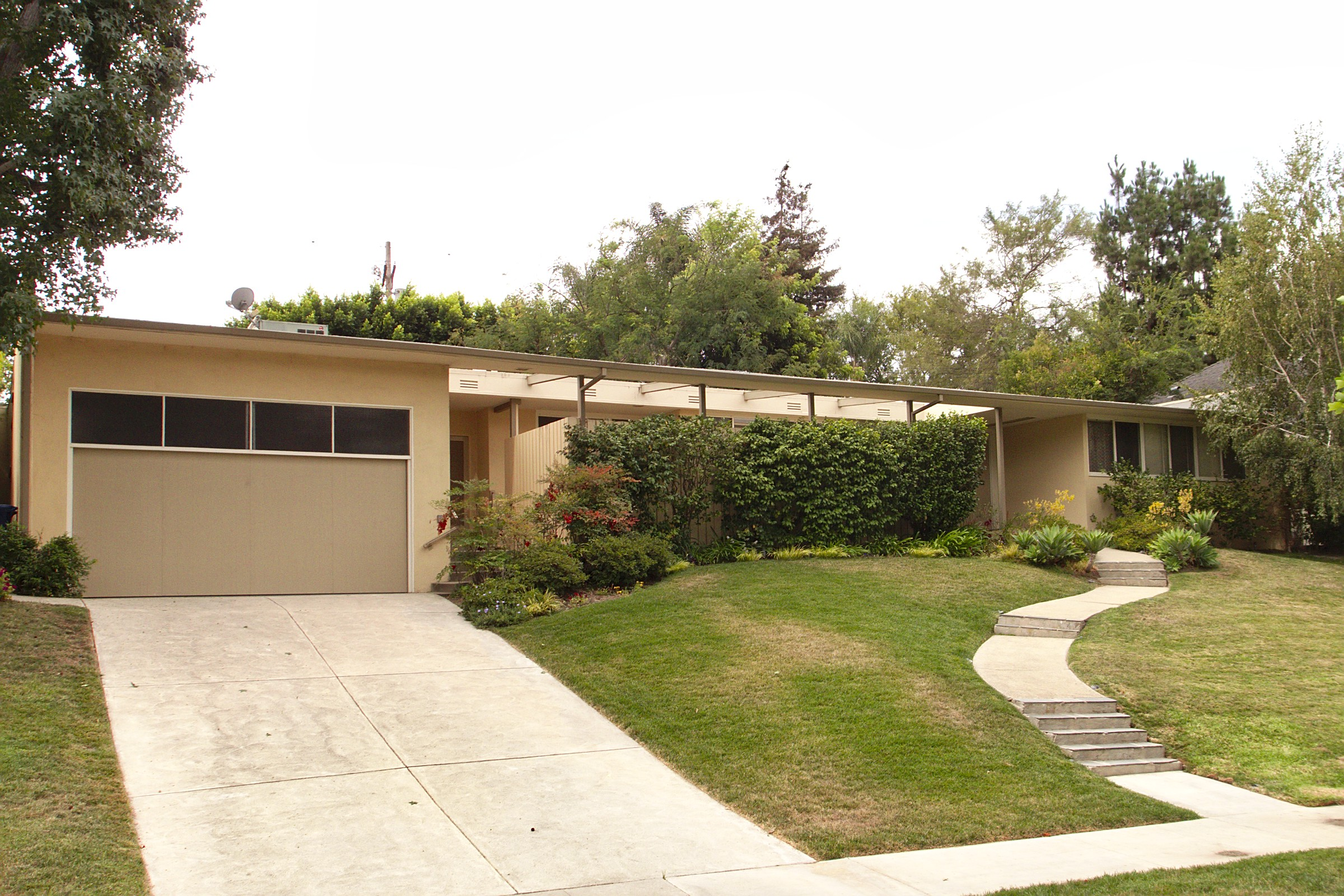

- Location within the Los Angeles metropolitan area Location within California Location within the United States
- Location: 10152 Toluca Lake Ave., Los Angeles, California
- Coordinates: 34°08′55″N 118°21′05″W
- Area: less than one acre
- Built: 1948
- Architect: JR Davidson
- Architectural style: International Style
- MPS: Case Study House Program MPS
- NRHP reference No.: 13000512
- Added to NRHP: July 24, 2013

Case Study House No. 1 is a residence located at 10152 Toluca Lake Avenue in Toluca Lake, Los Angeles, California, United States. It was designed by JR Davidson as part of the Case Study Houses program. The single-story house was completed in 1948 and consists of a wood frame on a concrete foundation, with glass, concrete blocks, and plywood used throughout. It is on the National Register of Historic Places.

== Description ==
Case Study House No. 1 is at 10152 Toluca Lake Avenue in the Toluca Lake neighborhood of Los Angeles, California, United States. The house is placed on a gradually-sloping hill and is surrounded by other modernist buildings. It consists of a wood frame on a concrete foundation, with glass, concrete blocks, and plywood used throughout. Designed by JR Davidson as part of the Case Study Houses program, Case Study House No. 1 is distinctive for its room layouts, use of built-in storage and furniture, and the inclusion of guest quarters separate from the rest of the house.

The house's facade consists largely of high walls facing the street and full-height glass doors and windows facing the garden and pool in the rear. The front door is hidden under a canopy and is reached through a pathway cutting through the yard. Also on the front fence and large foliage conceal a patio leading to the kitchen, along with a two-car garage left of the patio. The patio, which functioned as a service yard, was adapted from a feature Davidson included in his other house designs. A music studio behind the house, added later, cannot be seen from the street. Window openings include clerestories in the bathrooms and sliding or casement windows elsewhere.

The house is about 2,000 square feet (190 m^{2}), with three bedrooms and two bathrooms. One bedroom and one bathroom are placed on the opposite side of the house as the other bedrooms and bathroom. The separated bedroom has built-in furniture and a tiled bathroom and was originally intended as a guest room. The other two bedrooms were intended for the residents themselves. The front nursery and a larger rear room, abutting a common bathroom, both have closets and cabinets similar to those in ships. There is also a living–dining room in the rear, along with a kitchen. The interiors generally have plywood cabinets and plasterboard interiors, along with their original furniture and door hardware.

== History ==
The house was built as part of the Case Study Houses program, announced by publisher John Entenza in the January 1945 issue of Arts & Architecture magazine. The program, which ran until 1966, sought to develop inexpensive and efficient model homes to meet housing demand in the postwar United States. The first 13 Case Study houses were developed together in the 1940s, while the other houses were developed incrementally. These houses were built on private lots across Southern California, rather than at expositions or government-owned land as other demonstration houses had been, and were given a strict budget. The early Case Study houses tended to use wood, brick, concrete, and glass. Because the houses did not receive government subsidies, materials were either donated or, more commonly, bought at market value.

Davidson sought to design the house for a theoretical "Mr. and Mrs. X", a working couple with a teenage daughter and occasional visits from a mother-in-law. Davidson first drew up plans for a two-story structure with the two bedrooms—the master bedroom and a teenager's bedroom—in separate areas. Case Study House No. 1, initially intended for a site on South Barrington Avenue, was relocated to Toluca Lake in 1948, where it was redesigned as a single-family building. Despite its number, House 1 was not the first house constructed; that distinction belongs to Case Study House No. 11, also designed by Davidson and finished in 1946. House 1 was built in 1948, but it was unoccupied for three years. House 1, along with nine of the other remaining Case Study houses, were added to the National Register of Historic Places in 2013.

== See also ==
- National Register of Historic Places listings in Los Angeles

== Sources ==
- McCoy, Esther (1977). Case Study Houses, 1945-1962. Hennessey & Ingalls. ISBN 978-0-912158-70-9.
- National Register of Historic Places Inventory/Nomination: Case Study House No. 1 (Report). National Park Service. 2013. With accompanying pictures
- Neuhart, Marilyn; Neuhart, John (May 25, 1994). Eames House. Wiley. ISBN 978-3-433-02428-7. (The book has text in both English and German; page numbers are for the English text.)
- Pfaff, Lilian (2019). J. R. Davidson: A European Contribution to California Modernism. Birkhäuser. ISBN 978-3-0356-1937-9.
