= Marta Feuchtwanger =

German-American curator

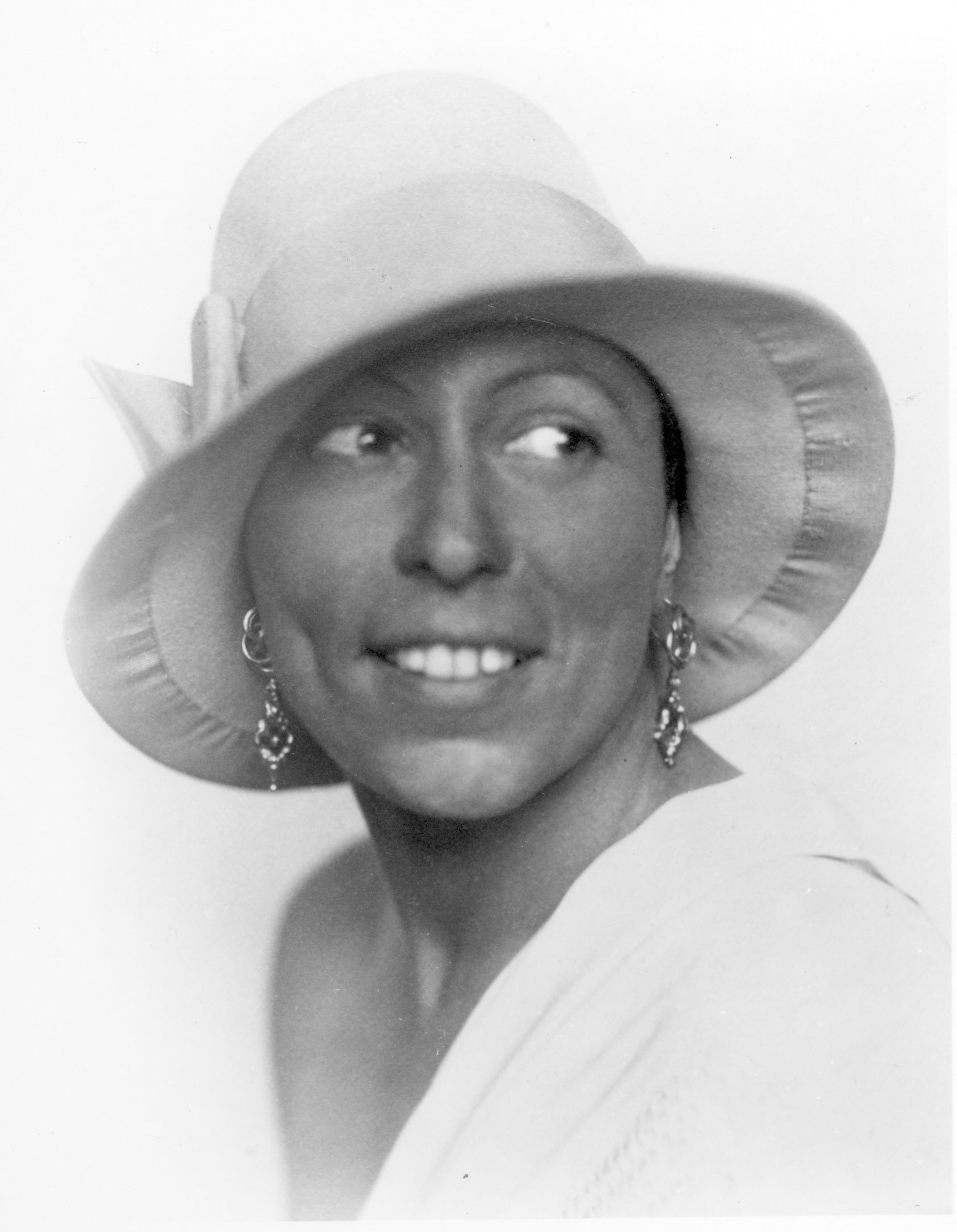
1926

Marta Feuchtwanger (née Löffler; 21 January 1891 – 25 October 1987) was the irrepressible and somewhat eccentric third child of a prosperous Munich businessman who in 1912 married the author Lion Feuchtwanger. Although they married only after Marta became pregnant with Feuchtwanger's child, the marriage lasted forty-six years and she became both a devoted wife and a huge influence on his work. The Jewish couple were forced to emigrate during the Hitler period. After her husband died in 1958 Marta Feuchtwanger spent nearly three decades as a high-profile widow in Los Angeles.

== Biography ==
=== Early years ===
Marta Löffler was born and grew up in Munich. Her parents were Leopold Löffler, a successful textiles merchant, and his wife, born Johanna Reitlinger. The family adhered to Liberal Judaism: they did not flaunt their Jewish faith or insist on rigid adherence to Jewish dietary rules. Her upbringing was comfortable and the ambiance was culturally rich. She came into contact with the works of Ibsen and Nietzsche at an early age. A keen gymnast, by the time she was fourteen Marta was the leader of a gymnastics group. She met Lion Feuchtwanger through his sister Franziska Feuchtwanger (Note: Franziska Feuchtwanger / Diamant 1890-1946) in 1909. When they discovered Marta was pregnant Lion Feuchtwanger proposed marriage. Although they both rejected marriage as a "bourgeois convention", they traveled to Überlingen on the north shore of Lake Constance and went through a quiet marriage ceremony on 10 May 1912. One source describes their decision to marry as "spontaneous". Lion Feuchtwanger's family opposed the marriage. Once married, the Feuchtwangers undertook a two-year tour together that included Switzerland, southern France, Italy and Tunisia.

=== Extended honeymoon ===
While still in Switzerland the couple undertook a strenuous hike which nearly ended in a miscarriage for Marta. Instead Elisabeth Marianne, their daughter, was born in Lausanne on 11 September 1912. The child was weak and the mother was diagnosed with childbed fever. The doctor recommended a warmer climate and the young family moved on to Pietra Ligure, along the coast from Genoa. It was here that the Feuchtwangers' only child died of Typhus, aged approximately ten weeks. The baby was buried in the local cemetery while her parents stayed on in the resort for another five months to grieve and to recover. Aspects of the experience would later find their way into several of Lion Feuchtwanger's novels. During the first part of 1913 they moved on to Monte Carlo and exhausted their savings in the casinos. They therefore hastened back to Italy and Lion Feuchtwanger started sending pieces of written work for publication to the Frankfurter Zeitung. That funded a trip that included Florence, Rome, Ischia, Capri, Naples and Syracuse. As they traveled they lived a hand to mouth existence, interacting with the poor. They contracted Typhus but survived. In July 1914 they took a boat to Tunisia, where they visited Arab bazaars and ancient Jewish streets in Tunis, before moving on to Carthage and Hammamet, where they were able to lodge with the French consul. They were not following the news from Europe, so were taken by surprise when their host announced that war had broken out between France and Germany: he would need to arrest them.

=== War years ===
In the event they were able to board a train back to nearby Tunis, where Lion Feuchtwanger was placed in prison. By the time he was released twelve hours later Marta Feuchtwanger had managed to book them space on a steamer back to Palermo. Lion Feuchtwanger made the voyage hidden under a lot of coal sacks because, as a German military reservist, he was obliged to travel with a German military identity document. Two other Germans on the crossing with military obligations to the German army were indeed tracked down by a French patrol and taken away, but the Feuchtwangers successfully landed on Italian soil and, penniless, sought out the German consul who was able to provide the train tickets and stamps in their identity documents that were necessary to enable them to return to Germany. They reached Munich in the middle of September 1914. Three of Lion Feuchtwanger's brothers were already fighting on the frontline. Lion launched his career as an author by presenting a translation into German of The Persians by Aeschylus. Widely seen in the context of those times as a statement of opposition to war, the play was staged in Munich and ran for three months between October and December 1914. Feuchtwanger was conscripted into the army in October 1914. Five months later he suddenly started coughing up blood and was rushed to hospital. He was therefore not with his regiment on the train journey to the frontline which set off the next morning and which ended unexpectedly when the train was blown up and his fellow conscripts were killed. Shortly after this a military doctor declared him physically unfit to serve in the army, but he nevertheless spent the rest of the war in a fluctuating state of poor health, depression and anxiety, concerned that he could at any moment be reconscripted. Meanwhile, he tried to pursue his literary career while Marta concentrated on the organising the necessities of their life together. She would always be the practical partner in a spectacularly unequal marriage: Lion Feuchtwanger was becoming a world-renowned novelist but he would never become a practical man. After the war, if they were out in a car together and experienced a puncture, it would be the fitness fanatic Marta who would change the wheel while Lion held the torch. Throughout their life together she would see herself as her husband's devoted servant. In Munich there was also scope for networking. During this time the still little known Bertolt Brecht approached Lion Feuchtwanger for help in establishing himself in the world of theatre: lifelong friendship ensued. It was Marta Feuchtwanger who recommended Brecht to change the name of the subsequently successful play on which he was working from "Spartakus" to the more politically innocuous "Trommeln in der Nacht" ("Drums in the Night").

=== Berlin ===
In 1925 Lion and Marta Feuchtwanger moved to Berlin which at this time was the vibrant cultural centre of the country. Life in Munich was becoming more threatening with the rise of the populist National Socialist movement. In 1922 there were reports of antisemitic graffiti being scrawled on the walls of the homes of Jewish writers. There were reports that if the 1923 Hitler Putsch in Munich had not been a fiasco, it would have been followed by arrest for Lion Feuchtwanger and Bertolt Brecht (who up to this point was also based in Munich). Nevertheless, it would probably be overstating the case to assert that the Fewuchtwanger's move to Berlin was a political decision driven primarily by antisemitism in Munich. The lure of Berlin as a cultural metropolis, which by 1925 had already drawn in Brecht and the writer Arnold Zweig, was powerful. Leon was by now enjoying significant commercial success with his books and in 1931 the couple had a house of their own built in the fashionable district of Berlin-Grunewald. In Autumn 1932, with the political situation in Germany ever more polarised and deadlocked, Marta Feuchtwanger accompanied her husband on a "reading trip" to London where an English-language translation of the first volume of Feuchtwanger's Josephus trilogy was being issued. It appears that Lion continued on to North America for an extended lecture tour while Marta returned to Berlin. At the end of the year she departed for her annual skiing holiday in St Anton. While she was away, on 30 January 1933, the Hitler government took power. The situation for Jews with a high public profile deteriorated very rapidly, and the Feuchtwangers were known to be fiercely critical of the National Socialists. Marta and Lion Feuchtwanger now stayed out of Germany. Their empty new home in Berlin-Grunewald was soon ransacked by Nazi paramilitaries.

=== Marseille ===
When he returned from North America in March 1933 Lion Feuchtwanger rejoined his wife who was still in St Anton. From here they now travelled together directly to Marseille and took a taxi towards he coast in order to find somewhere to live. On 21 April 1933 they set up a base in the Réserve Palace Hotel on the corniche along the coast at Bandol. They confided to their friend Arnold Zweig that what they missed more than the money they had been forced to leave behind (and forfeit) in Germany was, for Lion, their lost house and his books, while Marta missed most intensely the garden. They had difficulty finding a more permanent home and remained in the hotel, living out of suitcases, for some months, but Marseille was by now home to a growing colony of German exiled intellectuals and they were at this stage determined not to move away from the city. Feuchtwanger's Berlin publisher sold on literary rights to a publisher in Basel, so he was still able to publish his novels. His work was also accepted for publication in the United States and in England, but Marta nevertheless noticed that funds were running low. The need to move on from their hotel based existence became financially pressing, especially after they were joined in the hotel by Lola Sernau, Lion Feuchtwanger's longstanding secretary.

Fellow exiles included Thomas Mann who rented a villa in nearby Sanary-sur-Mer for the summer, and later recalled in his diary having met Marta at the Réserve Palace Hotel, describing her as an "Egyptian-like woman" (als eine "ägyptisch aussehende Frau"). His older brother, the novelist Heinrich Mann, also spoke of Marta's endlessly elegant and stylish deportment. During the summer of 1933, and then for the rest of the decade, the Feuchtwangers found themselves at the heart of a group of literary celebrities. In Sanary they came into contact with René Schickele and Aldous Huxley. After a time Marta found the Villa Lazare along the coast between Bandol and Sanary, which was available for rent. It had its own little private beach and a view across the bay from the Gorguette peninsular. In June 1933, after overcoming various bureaucratic challenges, the Feutchtwangers moved in. The house was not fully furnished and initially they slept on mattresses on the floor. There was no telephone. There was no separate kitchen, but at one end of the large main room was a fireplace that incorporated a cooking-grill. The Villa Lazare became a social centre for the German emigrant-writers' colony. Marta organised reading groups and extended tea parties that often included more than sixty guests. Lion Feuchtwanger was working night and day on the second novel in his Josephus trilogy]; he is rarely mentioned in connection with his wife's heroic socialising during this period. One of the first people Marta invited to stay after they moved into the Villa Lazare was their friend Bertolt Brecht. She sometimes teamed up with Brecht, Heinrich Mann and / or others to undertake exploratory excursions in the area. In addition to the many visitors, there was by now a permanent third resident at the Villa Lazarre. Lola Sernau had worked as Lion Feuchtwanger's secretary since 1925, and during the first part of 1933 she had managed to rescue several manuscripts from their former home in Berlin-Grunewald, before the Nazis ransacked the place. Because of the nature of the relationship between Lion and Lola, there were frequent tensions between the wife and the secretary.

During their time in Sanary the Feuchtwangers learned that back in Berlin their German citizenship had been taken away. In March 1934 the two of them moved to a more substantial house, the Villa Valmer in Sanary, which remained their home till 1939/40. As before their home was a meeting point for the exiled German community. Along with her focus on domestic hospitality and her regular skiing holidays, Marta also worked on the garden while Lion remained focused on his writing, also undertaking a number of lengthy foreign trips. After the outbreak of war in September 1939 Lion and Marta Feuchtanger, like many German refugees from the Nazis, were interned several times. Dangers intensified after the German invasion of May/June 1940 and the establishment of a pro-Nazi puppet state in southern France. Helped by Marta, and with active support from the US vice-consul in Marseille, Hiram Bingham (who at one stage sheltered him in his own villa in breach of US and French laws) and by the remarkable journalist Varian Fry, the Feuchtwangers were part of a little group that managed to escape to Portbou on the other side of the Spanish frontier, in September 1940. They made the final part of the French journey dressed and equipped as a band of recreational hikers. The price extracted by the Spanish border guards was paid in the time-honoured currency of Camel cigarettes.

After the outbreak of war Marta Feuchtwanger was detained for some time at the Gurs internment camp at the foot of the western Pyrenees. Conditions were poor: then, during the summer of 1940 she became increasingly alarmed by the appearance at the camp of German soldiers. The camp had been constructed in March-April 1939 to accommodate defeated antifascist fighters returning from the Spanish Civil War. In 1940, following the outbreak of war with Germany, it was reassigned, now used to hold "enemy aliens" - mostly Jewish and/or political refugees whose "enemy alien" status had been rapidly conferred when the war broke out - but at this stage the security at Camp Gurs was still low-level. Marta Feuchtwanger obtained a forged form authorizing her release on grounds of being over 70 (she was not quite 50), but when the time came to escape, according to her own recollections, she crawled under the fence (many Gurs internees from that time later claimed to have escaped; in reality, they were simply released on the condition that they had an address to go to and the means to support themselves). She presented the release authorization form at the nearest town, Oloron-Sainte-Marie, where she bought a train ticket. She knew, from a letter received from their house maid who was still in Sanary, that her husband was being held in a camp near Nimes. Her next stop was at the American consulate back in Marseilles where supported by a combination of her own chutzpah and her husband's international fame she made her way to the front of a long frightened queue, winding around several streets, of people desperate to escape. She informed the consular staff that Lion was being held at Camp des Milles, a detention facility near Nimes. A vice-consular official called Miles Standish drove to the camp and somehow extracted Lion Feuchtwanger, disguised as a woman. The escape seems to have involved the world-famous novelist swimming across a little river while wearing a dress. Stopped and challenged at a roadblock on the way back to Marseille, Standish persuaded the officials that the bedraggled figure on the back seat was his mother-in-law. Having arrived in Spain, the Feuchtwangers traveled across to Portugal by train. They travelled separately in order to try to avoid being spotted, although they were actually on the same train. Once in Portugal, they stayed in Estoril.

=== California ===
The couple crossed the Atlantic on separate ships, and when Marta arrived in the late Autumn/Fall of 1940 at New York City she was greeted both by her husband and by her husband's New York publisher, their friend Ben Huebsch. It was Huebsch who had arranged for friends to show the president's wife a photograph of the great writer, Lion Feuchtwanger, looking through a barbed wire fence from inside the Camp des Milles: that had led to an unofficial (but evidently effective) presidential instruction that the couple should be issued with emergency US visas. The Feuchtwangers then took the train from New York to Los Angeles where initially they stayed with the artist-caricaturist Eva Herrmann, already one of Lion's intimates.

Over the next couple of years the Feuchtwangers were obliged to move house five times. Then, at the start of 1943, they settled at Pacific Palisades, directly to the north of Los Angeles, and already a destination of choice for German race-refugee celebrities. The Villa Aurora (as it was subsequently named), built in 1927/28, was a substantial twenty room house with a massive garden that gave direct access to the beach. It had been empty for several years (following the bankruptcy of a builder believed to have been involved in an earlier attempt at restoration) and was in a terrible condition. Marta was nevertheless captivated by the view from the garden over the Bay of Santa Monica. Fuel rationing made the out-of-town location relatively unattractive and the price was correspondingly low. Lion appreciated the solitude and had just sold his novel "The Brothers Lautensack" for $9,000 to Collier's Magazine. They purchased the house outright, without needing a loan. A neighbor who hugely admired Lion's writings arranged for a handyman to join them and Marta meticulously masterminded a major rebuild while the house was filled, little by little, with furniture most of which was purchased second hand. The Feuchtwangers had lost one greatly treasured private library when they lost their home in Berlin-Grunewald, and just as Lion had been able to amass a replacement book collection at their home in Sanary they had been forced by political developments to move again, leaving virtually all the books behind. Once settled in Pacific Palisades, whenever they found themselves with money to spare, the priority was to rebuild the collection which, this time, would outlast them both. Meanwhile, the Californian coastal climate was not so different from that of the French Mediterranean coast and Marta again threw herself into making something of the garden. Once again the home became a focus for exiled artists. Regular guests at the reading groups, musical evenings, parties and intense political discussions included Thomas and Heinrich Mann, Bertolt Brecht, Franz and Alma Mahler-Werfel, Alfred Döblin, Ludwig Marcuse, Bruno Frank, Albert Einstein, Arnold Schoenberg, Kurt Weill, Hanns Eisler, Fritz Lang und Charlie Chaplin. Marta Feuchtwanger welcomed them all with Russian salad, sherry, and her homemade Apple strudel.

Over the next few years the Feuchtwangers repeatedly applied for US citizenship. However, during 1936/37 Lion Feuchtwanger had visited the Soviet Union. That, and the fact that some of his literary friends had had known Communist connections, seems to have been the reason that in the McCarthy era United States decisions over their applications were always postponed by the authorities. According to at least one source, during Lion Feuchtwanger's lifetime the Feuchtwanger's home at Pacific Palisades was kept under FBI surveillance. It was only shortly after Lion Feuchtwanger's death at the end of 1958 that Marta was informed that her application for citizenship had been accepted. Her initial reaction under the circumstances was to reject the status, but she thought better of it: on 10 January 1959 Marta Feuchtwanger became a US citizen. There were practical advantages. During her first fourteen years in America she had not dared to travel abroad because of the constant awareness that, as a non-citizen, there could be no guarantee that the US border guards would let her back in.

=== Widowhood ===
After Lion Feuchtwanger's death it fell to Marta Feuchtwanger, as his sole named heir, to decide how best to preserve his legacy. Hilde Waldo, her husband's secretary at the time of his death, worked with her on administering Lion's estate. Over the next year, with the help of the Germanistics scholar Harold von Hofe, she transferred the house, together with the 30,000 volumes by now contained in Lion Feuchtwanger's (third) personal library, to the University of Southern California. Marta received in return the right to occupy the house for the rest of her life. She was also employed as curator, receiving a small salary in recognition of her curatorial duties. But the university took over responsibility the costs of insurance and maintenance.

During nearly thirty years as a widow, Marta Feuchtwanger nurtured her husband's memory, becoming a significant figure in public life in the process. She provided guided tours round the house the Feuchtwangers had shared and became a regular guest at parties and official functions in the Los Angeles area. As a high-profile escapee from the Nazi nightmare, well connected to many literary and scholarly celebrities whose moves to Los Angeles had mirrored her own, she became an influential part of the Los Angeles cultural scene. In 1964 or 1966 (Note: Sources differ.) she was honoured by the West German president with the National Order of Merit ("Großes Bundesverdienstkreuz").

When, in January or April 1969, Marta Feuchtwanger visited West Germany for the first time it was at the invitation of Chancellor Brandt himself. She had first come across Willy Brandt when he was an exiled German leftwing activist in Paris during the 1930s. It was indeed the third time that Brandt had invited her, his first invitation having been sent when he was the Mayor of West Berlin. But she had turned down the first two invitations. She attended "official functions" and was, she later reported, received with great honour ("ehrenvoll") both in West Germany and in East Germany (the two were separate states between 1949 and 1990). She was therefore in Berlin for the opening of the Feuchtwanger Archive at the West Berlin Arts Academy.

In 1980 Marta Feuchtwanger received an honorary doctorate from the University of Southern California. In 1987 she died, aged 96, in Santa Monica. The physical remains of Marta and Lion Feuchtwanger are buried at Santa Monica's Woodlawn Memorial Cemetery.

== Feuchtwanger Memorial Library and Villa Aurora ==
The Feuchtwanger Memorial Library was inaugurated at the University of Southern California in 1995. Approximately a further 20,000 volumes from Lion Feuchtwanger's collection are held "on long-term loan" at the Feuchtwangers' former home, the Villa Aurora along the nearby coast. Alongside Lion Feuchtwanger's personal library and the literary legacies of Marta and Lion Feuchtwanger, other German emigrants from the period are also represented in the Memorial Library collection.

Following Marta Feuchtwanger's death, thanks to an initiative by the journalist-biographer Volker Skierka the Feuchtwangers' former home, the Villa Aurora, has been redesignated as an "Artists' Residence" in which German artists from various disciplines are able to live and work for three month terms.
