= Lion Feuchtwanger =

German writer (1884–1958)

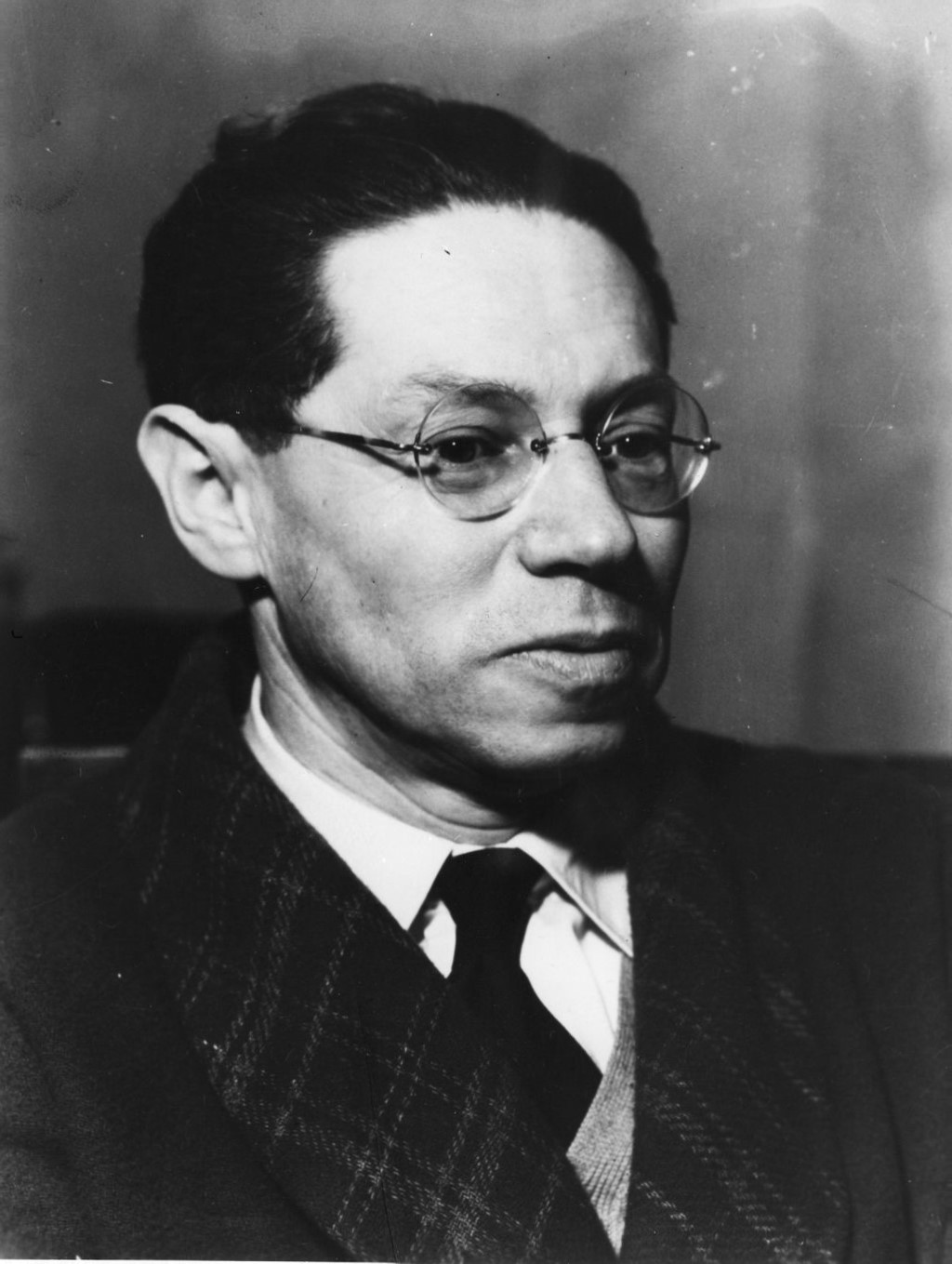
- Feuchtwanger in 1933
- Born: 7 July 1884; Munich, German Empire
- Died: 21 December 1958 (aged 74); Los Angeles, California, US
- Occupations: Novelist, playwright, essayist, theatre critic
- Writing career
- Notable works: Jud Süß (1925); The Oppermanns (1933)

Lion Feuchtwanger (German: [ˈliːɔn ˈfɔʏçtˌvaŋɐ]; 7 July 1884 – 21 December 1958) was a German Jewish novelist and playwright. A prominent figure in the literary world of Weimar Germany, he influenced contemporaries including playwright Bertolt Brecht.

Feuchtwanger's Judaism and fierce criticism of the Nazi Party, years before it assumed power, ensured that he would be a target of government-sponsored persecution after Adolf Hitler's appointment as chancellor of Germany in January 1933. Following a brief period of internment in France and a harrowing escape from continental Europe, he found asylum in the United States, where he died in 1958.

== Life and career ==
=== Ancestry ===
Feuchtwanger's Jewish ancestors originated from the Middle Franconian city of Feuchtwangen; following a pogrom in 1555, it had expelled all its resident Jews. Some of the expellees subsequently settled in Fürth, where they were called the "Feuchtwangers", meaning those from Feuchtwangen. Feuchtwanger's grandfather Elkan moved to Munich in the middle of the 19th century.

=== Early life ===
Lion Feuchtwanger was born in 1884 to Orthodox Jewish margarine manufacturer Sigmund Feuchtwanger and his wife, Johanna (née Bodenheimer). He was the oldest in a family of nine siblings of whom another two, Martin and Ludwig Feuchtwanger, also became authors; Ludwig's son was the London-based historian Edgar Feuchtwanger (1924–2025). Two of his sisters settled in Palestine following the rise of the Nazi Party. One was killed in a concentration camp, and another settled in New York.

Feuchtwanger made his first attempt at writing while still a secondary-school student and won an award. In 1903, in Munich, he passed his Abitur examinations at an elite school, the Wilhelmsgymnasium. He then studied history, philosophy and German philology in Munich and Berlin. He received his PhD in 1907, under Franz Muncker, with a study of Heinrich Heine's unfinished 1840 novel The Rabbi of Bacharach.

=== Early career ===
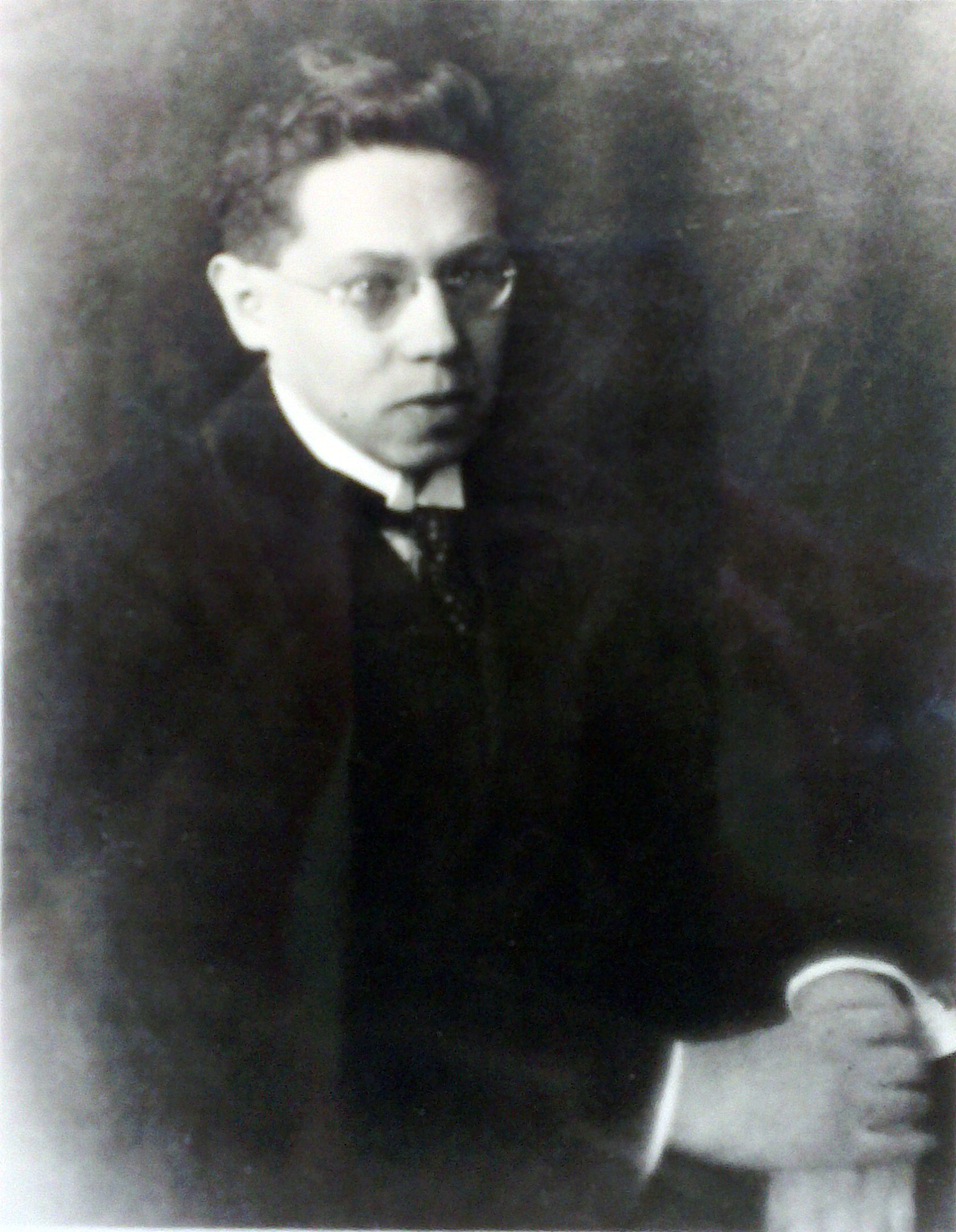
Feuchtwanger in 1909

After studying a variety of subjects, he became a theatre critic and founded the culture magazine Der Spiegel in 1908 (no connection to the post-WWII magazine of the same name). The first issue appeared on 30 April. After 15 issues and six months, Der Spiegel merged with Siegfried Jacobsohn's journal Die Schaubühne (renamed in 1918 to Die Weltbühne) for which Feuchtwanger continued to write. He was one of the contributors of the Swedish avant-garde magazine Thalia between 1910 and 1913. In 1912, he married a Jewish merchant's daughter, Marta Loeffler. She was pregnant at the wedding, but the child died shortly after birth.

After the outbreak of the First World War in 1914, Feuchtwanger served in the German military (November 1914), but was released early for health reasons. His experience as a soldier contributed to his leftist writings.

In 1916, he published a play based on the story of Joseph Süß Oppenheimer, which premiered in 1917, but Feuchtwanger withdrew it a couple of years later as he was dissatisfied with it.

During the German Revolution of 1918–1919, Feuchtwanger was ill and unable to participate.

=== Association with Brecht ===
Feuchtwanger soon became a figure in the literary world, and he was sought out by the young Bertolt Brecht. Both collaborated on drafts of Brecht's early work, The Life of Edward II of England, in 1923–1924. According to Feuchtwanger's widow, Marta, Feuchtwanger was a possible source for the titles of two other Brecht works, including Drums in the Night (first called Spartakus by Brecht).

=== Shift from drama to novels ===
After some success as a playwright, Feuchtwanger shifted his emphasis to writing historical novels. His most successful work in this genre was Jud Süß (Süss, the Jew), written 1921–1922, published 1925, which was well received internationally. His second great success was The Ugly Duchess Margarete Maultasch. For professional reasons, he moved to Berlin in 1925 and then to a large villa in Grunewald in 1932. He published the first part of his Josephus trilogy, The Jewish War, in 1932.

In 1930, Feuchtwanger wrote his first socio-political novel Erfolg (Success), based on the events of Beer Hall Putsch, as his reaction on the impending threat of Nazism; the novel would become the first entry in Wartesaal trilogy about the rise of Nazism in Germany. He continued the trilogy with The Oppermanns in 1933, which would become one of his best-known books.

=== Persecution by the Nazis ===
==== Early opposition ====
Feuchtwanger was one of the first to produce propaganda against Hitler and the Nazi Party. As early as 1920 he published in the satirical text Conversations with the Wandering Jew:

Towers of Hebrew books were burning, and bonfires were erected as high as the clouds, and people burnt to char, innumerable, and voices of priests sang in accompaniment: Gloria in excelsis Deo. Traces of men, women, children dragged themselves across the square, from all sides, they were naked or in rags, and they had nothing with them but bodies and the tatters of book scrolls – of torn, disgraced book scrolls, soiled with feces. And there followed them men in kaftans and women and children in the clothes of our day, countlessly, endlessly.

==== Rise of Nazism and exile ====
In 1930, Feuchtwanger published Erfolg (Success), a fictionalized account of the rise and fall of the Nazi Party (in 1930, he considered it a thing of the past) during the inflation era. The Nazis soon began persecuting him, and while he was on a speaking tour of America, in Washington, D.C., he was guest of honor at a dinner hosted by the then ambassador Friedrich Wilhelm von Prittwitz und Gaffron on the same day (30 January 1933) that Hitler was appointed Chancellor. The next day, Prittwitz resigned from the diplomatic corps and called Feuchtwanger to recommend that he not return home. Feuchtwanger, however, did not heed his advice and returned to Germany.

In 1933, while Feuchtwanger was on tour, his house was ransacked by government agents who stole or destroyed many items from his extensive library, including invaluable manuscripts of some of his projected works (one of the characters in The Oppermanns undergoes an identical experience). In the summer of 1933, his name appeared on the first of Hitler's Ausbürgerungsliste, which were documents by which the Nazis arbitrarily deprived Germans of their citizenship and so rendered them stateless. During that time, he published the novel The Oppermanns. Feuchtwanger and his wife did not return to Germany but moved to Southern France, settling in Sanary-sur-Mer. His works were included among those burned in the 10 May 1933 Nazi book burnings held across Germany. Later Success and The Oppermanns would become the first two parts of the Wartesaal ("The Waiting Room") trilogy.

On 25 August 1933, the official German government gazette, Reichsanzeiger, included Feuchtwanger's name on the list of those whose German citizenship was revoked because of "disloyalty to the German Reich and the German people." Because Feuchtwanger had addressed and predicted many of the Nazis' crimes even before they came to power, Hitler considered him a personal enemy, and the Nazis designated Feuchtwanger as the "Enemy of the state number one," as mentioned in The Devil in France.

In his writings, Feuchtwanger exposed Nazi racist policies years before the British and French governments abandoned their policy of appeasement towards Hitler. He remembered that American politicians were also among those who suggested that "Hitler be given a chance". With the publication of Success in 1930 and The Oppermanns in 1933, he became a prominent spokesman in opposition to the Third Reich. Within a year, the novel was translated into the Czech, Danish, English, Finnish, Hebrew, Hungarian, Norwegian, Polish and Swedish languages. In 1936, still in Sanary, he wrote The Pretender (Der falsche Nero), in which he compared the Roman upstart Terentius Maximus, who had claimed to be Nero, with Hitler.

After leaving Germany in 1933, Feuchtwanger lived in Sanary-sur-Mer. The high sales of his books, especially in the Anglo-Saxon world, allowed him a relatively comfortable life in exile. In 1940, he finished Wartesaal with the third novel, Exil (translated into English as Paris Gazette).

==== Imprisonment and escape ====
When France declared war on Germany in 1939, Feuchtwanger was interned for a few weeks in Camp des Milles. When the Germans invaded France in 1940, Feuchtwanger was captured and again imprisoned at Les Milles. Later, the prisoners of Les Milles were moved to a makeshift tent-camp near Nîmes because of the advance of German troops. From there, he was smuggled to Marseille disguised as a woman. After months of waiting in Marseille, he fled with his wife Marta to the United States via Spain and Portugal, staying briefly in Estoril, with the help of several Americans involved in helping artists and writers in danger of persecution by Nazi Germany escape Nazi-controlled Europe. His rescuers included Varian Fry (an American journalist who helped refugees escape from occupied France); Hiram Bingham IV (US Vice Consul in Marseille); Myles Standish (US Vice Consul in Marseille); Waitstill Sharp and Martha Sharp (a Unitarian minister and his wife who were in Europe on a similar mission as Fry).

Waitstill Sharp volunteered to accompany Feuchtwanger by rail from Marseille, across Spain, to Lisbon. Had Feuchtwanger been recognized at border crossings in France or Spain, he might have been detained and turned over to the Gestapo. Realizing that Feuchtwanger might be abducted by Nazi agents even in Portugal, Martha Sharp gave up her own berth on the Excalibur so Feuchtwanger could sail immediately for New York City with her husband.

Feuchtwanger's arrival in New York in early October 1940 had adverse consequences on the escape organizations in France. The novelist "out of an unplumbable naivety or an unforgivable and opportunistic ego" described his escape in detail to The New York Times. His rescuers in France were endangered by Feuchtwanger's indiscretions. The news story soon got to Europe with the consequence that Spain closed its borders, possibly under pressure from Nazi Germany. The closed border with Spain caused rescue operations to nearly cease for the remainder of the year.

=== Asylum in United States ===
Granted political asylum in the United States, Feuchtwanger settled in Los Angeles in 1941, when he published a memoir of his internment, The Devil in France (Der Teufel in Frankreich).

In 1943, Feuchtwanger bought Villa Aurora in Pacific Palisades, California; he continued to write there until his death in 1958. In 1944, he cofounded the publishing house Aurora-Verlag in New York City.

=== Stalinism ===
In response to the Western Powers pursuing a policy of appeasement of Nazi Germany and Fascist Italy (the Anglo-German Naval Treaty of 1935; allowing the German reoccupation of the Rhineland (1936); non-intervention against the 1936 Falangist Coup in Spain; Italy's attack on Abyssinia in 1935), Feuchtwanger flirted with Soviet communism out of a longing to find the staunchest enemy of Germany's National Socialism.

From November 1936 to February 1937 he travelled to the Soviet Union. In his book Moskau 1937, he praised life under Joseph Stalin. Feuchtwanger also defended the Great Purge and the show trials which were then taking place against both real and imagined Trotskyites and "enemies of the people". Feuchtwanger's praise of Stalin triggered outrage from Arnold Zweig and Franz Werfel. The book has been criticized by Trotskyists as a work of naive apologism. Feuchtwanger's friendly attitude toward Stalin later delayed his naturalization in the United States.

=== Postwar ===
During the McCarthy era, Feuchtwanger became the target of suspicion as a pro-Soviet intellectual. In 1947 he wrote a play about the Salem Witch Trials, Wahn oder der Teufel in Boston (Delusion, or The Devil in Boston), thus anticipating the theme of The Crucible (1953) by Arthur Miller; Wahn premiered in Germany in 1949. It was translated by June Barrows Mussey and performed in Los Angeles in 1953 under the title "The Devil in Boston." In New York a Yiddish translation was shown. At the end of life, Feuchtwanger dealt with Jewish themes again (The Jewess of Toledo) and advocated for the State of Israel as a Jewish refuge.

In 1953, Feuchtwanger won the National Prize of East Germany first Class for art and literature.

=== Illness and death ===
Lion Feuchtwanger became ill with stomach cancer in 1957. After several operations he died from internal bleeding in late 1958. His wife Marta continued to live in their house on the coast and remained an important figure in the exile community, devoting the remainder of her life to the work of her husband. Before her death in 1987, Marta Feuchtwanger donated her husband's papers, photos and personal library to the Feuchtwanger Memorial Library, housed within the Special Collections of the Doheny Memorial Library at the University of Southern California.

== Major works ==
=== Jud Süß ===
Feuchtwanger was already well known throughout Germany in 1925, when his first popular novel, Jud Süß (Jew Suss), appeared. The story of Joseph Süß Oppenheimer had been the subject of a number of literary and dramatic treatments over the course of the past century, the earliest Wilhelm Hauff's 1827 novella. The most successful literary adaptation was Feuchtwanger's 1925 novel, based on a play he had written in 1916 but then withdrawn. Feuchtwanger intended his portrayal of Süß not as an antisemitic slur but as a study of the tragedy caused by the human weaknesses of greed, pride, and ambition.

The novel was rejected by the major publishing houses and then was reluctantly taken on by a small publishing house. However, the novel was so well received that it went through five printings of 39,000 copies within a year as well as being translated into 17 languages by 1931. The novel's success established Feuchtwanger as a major German author as well as giving him a royalty stream that afforded him a measure of financial independence for the rest of his life.

His drama and his hugely successful novel were adapted for the cinema screen initially in a sympathetic version produced at Denham Studios in Great Britain in 1934 under the direction of fellow German expatriate Lothar Mendes with one of Germany's greatest actors, also a refugee from Nazi persecution, Conrad Veidt: Jew Süss.

The NSDAP party in Germany then made their own antisemitic version under the very same title, to undercut the British film. The Nazi film industry version was made under the direction of Veit Harlan: Jud Süß (1940). Unlike the British version, the antisemitic film, released in 1940, portrays Oppenheimer as an evil character.

=== The Oppermanns ===
In January 1933, Hitler became the Chancellor of Germany. Feuchtwanger reacted to the regime change with the novel The Oppermanns. At first, Feuchtwanger was writing it as a screenplay proposed by the British Government, however, it was never completed and instead was reworked into a novel, resulting in the book's style, which differs with quick-cuts and literary montage sequences. After being released the same year, it instantly became popular and was translated into over 10 languages. Klaus Mann later praised the novel as the "most striking, most widely read narrative description of the calamity that descended over Germany"; Frederick S. Roffman wrote in The New York Times in 1983 that "no single historical or fictional work has more tellingly or insightfully depicted the relentless disintegration of German humanism, the insidious manner in which Nazism began to permeate the fabric of German society."

In 2018, Deutsche Welle put the novel in their "100 German Must-Reads" list, called it "Feuchtwanger's most recognized novel" and wrote that today it is "considered one of the most important literary works documenting the downfall of a democracy".

As Roffman noted, Feuchtwanger's popularity has declined after the 1950s in the English-speaking countries, while remaining strong in the German-speaking ones. In 2022, the novel was rediscovered, and a new version of the English translation of The Oppermanns was released, with an introduction by Joshua Cohen, who also noted the lack of Feuchtwanger's popularity in English-speaking countries.

Given that Feuchtwanger’s books were so explicitly and accessibly addressed to a general audience, it’s poignant that he has none now. His novels go unread; his plays go unperformed; he’s a first-class writer without a first-class berth; a classic firebrand without a canon.

In his review of the novel, Cohen calls it "one of the last masterpieces of German Jewish culture".

== Books ==
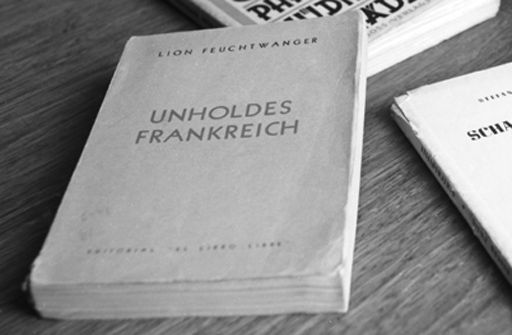
The first edition of Unholdes Frankreich

- Die häßliche Herzogin Margarete Maultasch (The Ugly Duchess), 1923 —about Margarete Maultasch (14th century in Tyrol)
- Leben Eduards des Zweiten von England (The Life of Edward II of England), 1924: written with Bertolt Brecht.
- Jud Süß (Jew Suess, Power), 1925.
- PEP: J.L. Wetcheeks amerikanisches Liederbuch (PEP: J.L. Wetcheek's American Song Book), 1928
- The Wartesaal Trilogy (or, The "Waiting Room" Trilogy)
  - Erfolg. Drei Jahre Geschichte einer Provinz (Success: Three Years in the Life of a Province), 1930
  - Die Geschwister Oppermann (The Oppermanns), Querido, 1933; published in an English translation by James Cleugh, by Secker, 1933
  - Exil (Paris Gazette); German-language edition published by Querido, in Amsterdam, 1940; published in an English translation by Willa and Edwin Muir, by Viking, 1940
- The Josephus Trilogy—about Flavius Josephus beginning in the year 60 in Rome
  - Der jüdische Krieg (Josephus), 1932
  - Die Söhne (The Jew of Rome), 1935
  - Der Tag wird kommen (Das gelobte Land, The day will come, Josephus and the Emperor), 1942
- Marianne in Indien und sieben andere Erzählungen (Marianne in Indien, Höhenflugrekord, Stierkampf, Polfahrt, Nachsaison, Herrn Hannsickes Wiedergeburt, Panzerkreuzer Orlow, Geschichte des Gehirnphysiologen Dr. Bl.), 1934—title translated into English as Little Tales and as Marianne in India and seven other tales (Marianne in India, Altitude Record, Bullfight, Polar Expedition, The Little Season, Herr Hannsicke's Second Birth, The Armored Cruiser "Orlov", History of the Brain Specialist Dr. Bl.)
- Der falsche Nero (The Pretender), 1936—about Terentius Maximus, the "False Nero"
- Moskau 1937 (Moscow 1937), 1937
- Unholdes Frankreich (Ungracious France; also Der Teufel in Frankreich, The Devil in France), 1941
- Die Brüder Lautensack (Die Zauberer, Double, Double, Toil and Trouble, The Lautensack Brothers), 1943
- Simone, 1944
- Der treue Peter (Faithful Peter), 1946
- Die Füchse im Weinberg (Proud Destiny, Waffen für Amerika, Foxes in the Vineyard), 1947/48 – a novel mainly about Pierre Beaumarchais and Benjamin Franklin beginning in 1776's Paris
- Wahn oder Der Teufel in Boston. Ein Stück in drei Akten ("The Devil in Boston: A Play about the Salem Witchcraft Trials"), Los Angeles 1948.
- Odysseus and the Swine, and Other Stories, 1949; a collection of sixteen short stories, some published in book form for the first time (London: Hutchinson International Authors Ltd, 1949)
- Goya, 1951—a novel about the famous painter Francisco Goya in the 1790s in Spain ("This is the Hour" New York: Heritage Press, 1956)
- Narrenweisheit oder Tod und Verklärung des Jean-Jacques Rousseau ('Tis folly to be wise, or, Death and transfiguration of Jean-Jaques Rousseau), 1952, a novel set before and during the Great French Revolution
- Die Jüdin von Toledo (Spanische Ballade, Raquel, The Jewess of Toledo), 1955
- Jefta und seine Tochter (Jephthah and his Daughter, Jephta and his daughter), 1957

== Awards ==
- 1957: National Jewish Book Award for Raquel: The Jewess of Toledo

== See also ==
- Exilliteratur
