= Wende Museum =

The Wende
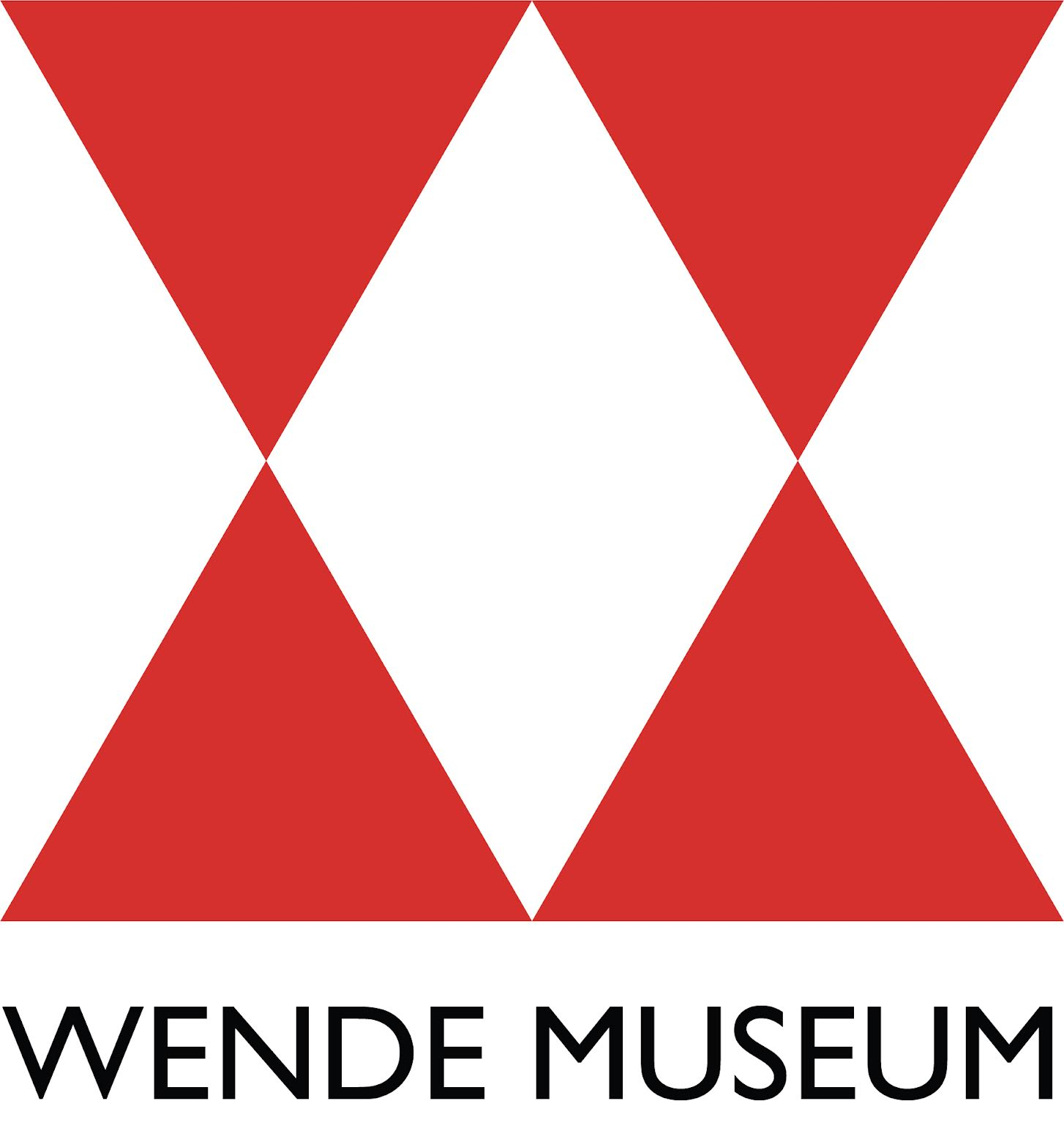

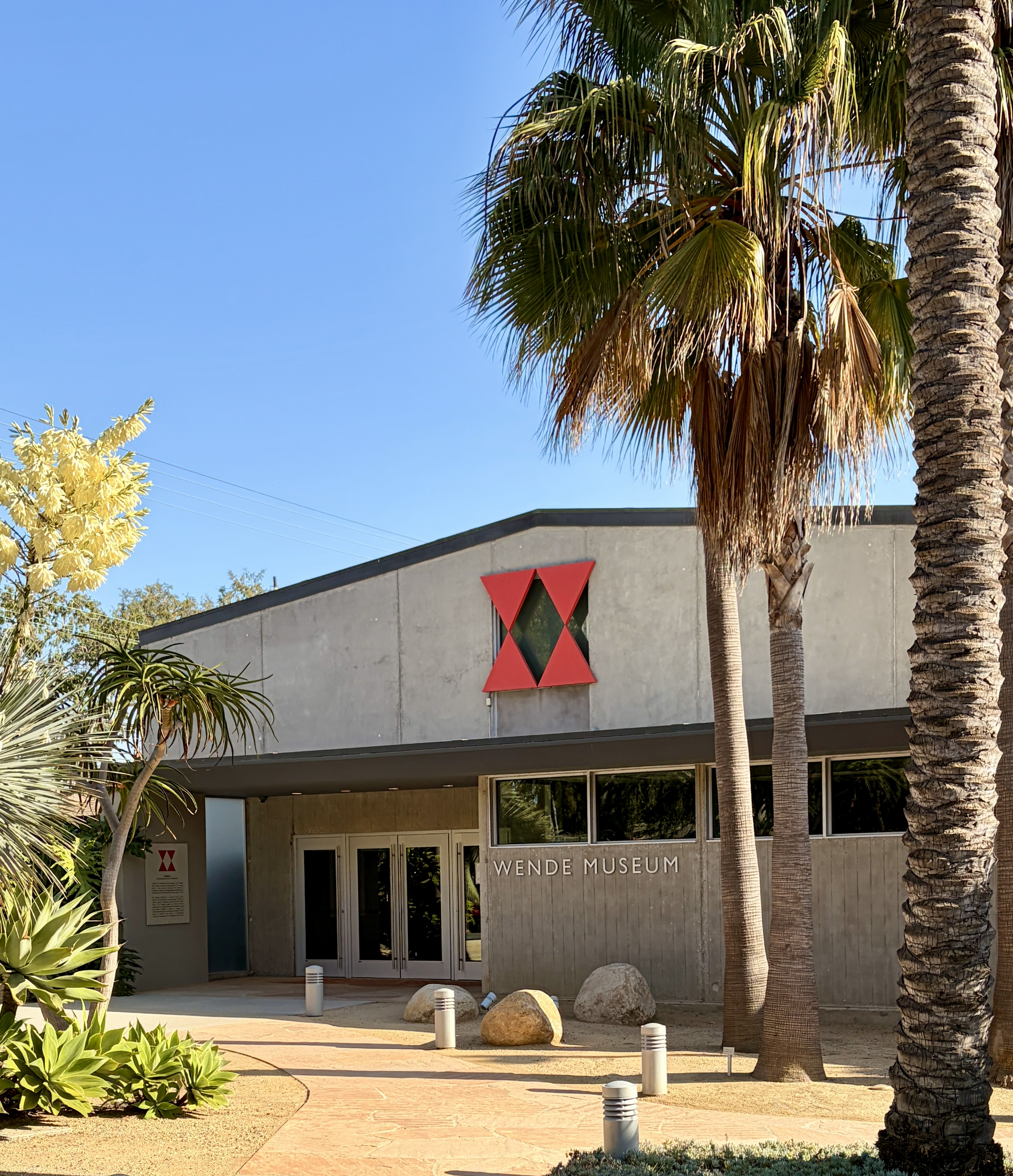
- Established: 2002
- Location: 10808 Culver Boulevard; Culver City, CA 90230
- Coordinates: 34.011647°N 118.403932°W
- Type: Cultural museum
- Director: Justinian Jampol
- Website: www.wendemuseum.org

The Wende is an art museum, archive, and cultural center in Culver City, California. It focuses on the history and material culture of dissident movements, civil society, and human rights advocacy in the late 20th century. Founded in 2002, the museum preserves and provides public access to cultural materials documenting nonconformist networks and resistance movements, including Solidarity in Poland and Jewish life and activism in the Soviet Union. Its exhibitions and public programs address connections between history, art, wellness, and community engagement.

== Mission ==
Wende (pronounced VEN-deh) is German for "transformation," a term commonly associated with the political and social changes surrounding the fall of the Berlin Wall in 1989 and the dissolution of the Soviet Union in 1991.

The museum was established in response to the dispersal, damage, and loss of archives and personal collections following the political transformations of the Late 20th Century. Its mission emphasizes rescuing, preserving, and providing public access to at-risk cultural materials, including items held outside official institutions.

Areas of focus include dissident movements, civil society initiatives, human rights advocacy, and everyday life under state socialism. Particular attention is given to nonconformist networks and resistance movements, such as the Solidarity movement in Poland and Jewish activism in the Soviet Union, including the Refusenik movement.

== Programs ==
Initially a collections-focused institution primarily accessed by researchers, the Wende has developed into a public cultural organization offering exhibitions, lectures, performances, educational initiatives, and wellness programs. In 2024, the Wende opened a new three-story community center, where the Wende and partner nonprofits present cultural, educational, and wellness programs.The Wende Museum's Community Center was named one of the "8 Best New Architecture Projects in L.A. for 2024" by the Los Angeles Times.

Since relocating to its current campus, the Wende has expanded its public programming. Partnerships with schools, artists, and nonprofit organizations support activities in the arts and civic engagement. Admission to the museum is free.

Programming includes exhibitions, performances, lectures, workshops, and public events presented independently and in collaboration with external organizations, some incorporating community participation and wellness-related activities. Programs are offered at the museum, the community center, and online, and include multidisciplinary exhibitions, school tours, family-oriented events, and discussion series.

In 2024, the Wende participated in Getty's PST Art: Art and Science Collide with the exhibition Counter/Surveillance: Control, Privacy, Agency, featuring contemporary artworks by Sadie Barnette, Paolo Cirio, Ken Gonzales-Day, Gerhard Lang, Nedko Solakov, and Xu Bing, among others. The Wende also participated in Getty's PST Art Climate Impact Program.

== Collections ==
The Wende's collections document the political transformations of the late 20th century, with significant holdings related to the cultural, political, and artistic history of the Cold War and its aftermath across the former Eastern Bloc and other socialist states, including the Soviet Union, China, Vietnam, North Korea, and Cuba.

The museum holds more than 100,000 artworks, objects, and archival materials, with strengths in materials related to political dissent, social movements, migration, and cultural memory.

The collection ranges from consumer products (e.g., computers, radios, records, toiletries, foodstuff) to works of modern and contemporary art in all media (e.g., paintings, drawings, sculptures, graphics, photographs), iconic political symbols (e.g., statuary, medals, flags, uniforms, commemorative gifts), and archives—including a substantial gift from East German leader Erich Honecker's estate—and some 3,500 16mm documentary, animation, and educational films as well as home movies from the GDR. The museum contains large collections of furniture, flags and banners, commemorative plates, communist folk art, menus, family albums, and design items.

In recent years, the museum has acquired collections related to Soviet Jewry and the Refusenik movement, Hungarian Cold War era artworks and artifacts, Russian countercultural materials from the 1960s and 1970s, Polish Solidarity materials, Soviet demilitarization albums, and artifacts from the former KGB Espionage Museum. The Wende also holds oral history collections, including the Historical Witness Project and the archive of the Albanian Human Rights Project.

In 2026, the Wende announced that it was building a new archival storage and research facility in Hawthorne, California. The facility will serve as the permanent home of the Wende's collections.

The museum's East German collections are the subject of the books Beyond the Wall (Taschen, 2014) and The East German Handbook (TASCHEN, 2019).

The museum's collections have been exhibited at institutions including the Los Angeles County Museum of Art, Fondazione Prada, Getty Research Institute, Imperial War Museum, Harry S. Truman Presidential Library and Museum, Ronald Reagan Presidential Library, Gerald Ford Presidential Library, and the International Spy Museum.

== Organizational history ==
The Wende was founded in 2002 by Justinian Jampol, a native of Los Angeles and scholar of modern European history.

The museum was housed for more than a decade in an office park. In November 2012, the City Council of Culver City approved a 75-year lease of the former United States National Guard Armory building on Culver Boulevard as the museum's permanent location. The Armory building was constructed in 1949 and decommissioned in March 2011. Following renovations, the Wende opened to the public at the site in November 2017.

The site has since been developed into a campus that includes exhibition galleries, outdoor installations, gardens, and the Wende Museum's Community Center.

The Wende's one-acre campus includes the museum, gardens, and community spaces. In the garden is a former East German guardhouse that once controlled access to the Allgemeiner Deutscher Nachrichtendienst (ADN), the state news agency of the German Democratic Republic. The guardhouse now hosts contemporary art installations.

== Education and access ==
The Wende provides educational programs for students, researchers, and the public, including school tours, workshops, lectures, and collaborative projects. Its collections are accessible onsite and through digital resources.

The museum also operates training initiatives for young people from underserved communities in Los Angeles, offering experience with museum collections and arts programming through partnerships with schools and community organizations.
