= List of ambassadors of Malta to the United States =

Coordinates: 38.917203°N 77.046958°W

Ambassador of Malta to the United States Embassy of Malta in Washington, D.C.
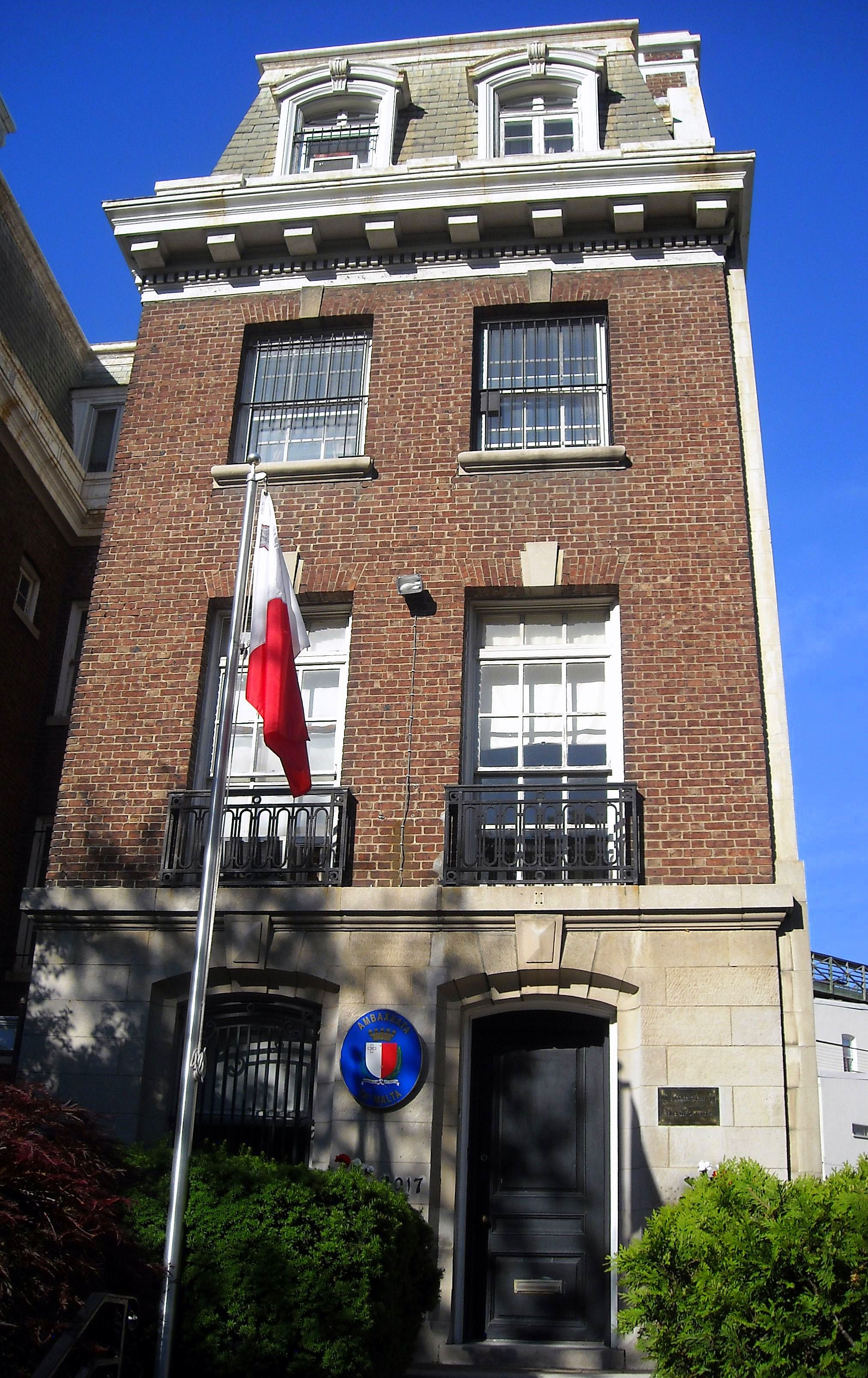
- Incumbent; Godfrey Carmel Xuereb since March 2, 2016
- Inaugural holder: Arvid Pardo
- Formation: February 7, 1967

The Maltese ambassador in Washington, D. C. is the official representative of the Government in Valletta to the Government of the United States.

== List of representatives ==
Diplomatic agrément	Diplomatic accreditation	Ambassador	Observations	List of prime ministers of Malta	List of presidents of the United States	Term end
January 30, 1967	February 7, 1967	Arvid Pardo		George Borg Olivier	Lyndon B. Johnson	
June 19, 1971		Adrian Mercieca	Chargé d'affaires	Dom Mintoff	Richard Nixon	
October 5, 1971	October 21, 1971	Joseph Attard-Kingswell		Dom Mintoff	Richard Nixon	
October 20, 1980		Emanuel C. Farrugia	Chargé d'affaires	Dom Mintoff	Jimmy Carter	
July 29, 1981	September 21, 1981	Leslie N. Agius	Ambassador	Dom Mintoff	Ronald Reagan	
January 22, 1987	February 10, 1987	Alfred J. Falzon	12.02.2005 he was Ambassador in Stockholm	Karmenu Mifsud Bonnici	Ronald Reagan	
April 4, 1988	July 5, 1988	Salv. J. Stellini	*On March 31, 2006 he was appointed ambassador to Lisbon	Eddie Fenech Adami	Ronald Reagan	
September 4, 1991	October 1, 1991	Albert Borg Olivier de Puget		Eddie Fenech Adami	George H. W. Bush	
May 13, 1997	May 14, 1997	Mark Micallef		Alfred Sant	Bill Clinton	
July 23, 1999	August 10, 1999	George E. Saliba		Eddie Fenech Adami	Bill Clinton	
February 24, 2003	February 26, 2003	John Lowell		Eddie Fenech Adami	George W. Bush	
May 21, 2007	July 25, 2007	Mark Anthony Miceli-Farrugia		Lawrence Gonzi	George W. Bush	
July 19, 2012	July 30, 2012	Joseph Cole		Lawrence Gonzi	Barack Obama	
August 22, 2013	July 17, 2013	Marisa Maria Louise Micallef		Joseph Muscat	Barack Obama	
February 5, 2016	March 2, 2016	Pierre Clive Agius		Joseph Muscat	Barack Obama	January 13, 2020
January 2017		Keith Azzopardi	Ambassador	Joseph Muscat	Donald Trump	
July 2022		Melanie Bonnici Bennett	Chargé d'affaires	Robert Abela	Joe Biden	
April 17, 2023		Godfrey Carmel Xuereb	Ambassador			
