= List of ambassadors of Malta to France =

The following is the list of ambassadors of Malta to France. These are the Maltese diplomats who served as ambassadors to France since 1981.

== List of Ambassadors ==
- Leslie N. Agius - 30/07/1981
- Albert Borg Olivier de Puget - 02/10/1987
- J. Licari - 07/10/1991
- Vincent Camilleri - 11/02/1997
- Prof. Salvino Busuttil - 16/03/1999
- Dr Vicki Ann Cremona - 04/07/2005
- Mark A. Miggiani - 02/07/2009
- Pierre Clive Agius - 11/12/2012
- Vincent Camilleri - 15/11/2013
- Patrick Mifsud - 09/11/2016
- Helga Mizzi - 13/10/2017
- Carmelo Inguanez - 09/12/2019
- Pierre Clive Agius - 29/02/2024
