= Vicki Ann Cremona =

Maltese academic and former ambassador

Maltese Ambassador to Tunisia
- In office 2009–2013

Maltese Ambassador to France
- In office 7 April 2005 – 7 February 2009
- Preceded by: Salvino Busuttil
- Succeeded by: Mark A Miggiani

Vicki Ann Cremona is a Maltese academic, activist, and former ambassador. She is the Chair of the School of Performing Arts at the University of Malta, and a professor in the Theatre Studies Department. She served as Ambassador to France (2005–2009), and to Tunisia between 2009 and 2013. She has been the president of Repubblika, an NGO dedicated to preserving the rule of law, since 2024.

== Ambassadorships ==
Cremona served as Ambassador to France from April 2005 to February 2009. She was chosen for the position in part because she had lived in France for a number of years. As ambassador, she visited French secondary schools to discuss Maltese history and culture. During her term, the French government held the presidency of the Council of the European Union. As part of this, the French government undertook an initiative to publish a play from each country in the EU. Cremona later said that "I offered several Maltese plays and the organisers kept turning them down because they were too 'amateur'". This experience has driven Cremona to support programs fostering playwrights in Malta.

She served as Ambassador to Tunisia between 2009 and 2013. While in the role, she gave talks on Maltese culture and met with Tunisian political leaders and Maltese expatriates.

== Academic career ==
Cremona is the Chair of the School of Performing Arts at the University of Malta, and a professor in the Theatre Studies Department.

Much of Cremona's academic writing and research has focused on theatre in Malta. In addition to writing several books, Cremona has also contributed chapters on theatre and performance to two Routledge Companion books.

== Repubblika ==
Cremona served as Repubblika's president from 2019 to 2020. She returned to the position as acting president in early 2024; she was confirmed as president in September 2024. She has spoken in favor of freedom of the press, and criticized Maltese Prime Minister Robert Abela's policies regarding the press.

== Publications ==
Some of the books Cremona co-edited and co-authored include:

- Spazji Teatrali, A Catalogue of Theatres in Malta and Gozo (2017)
- Carnival and Power: Play and Politics in a Crown Colony. Transnational Theatre Histories. Cham: Palgrave Macmillan. 2018. ISBN 978-3-319-70655-9.

=== As editor ===
- Cremona, Vicki Ann, ed. (2014). Playing Culture: Conventions and Extensions of Performance. Themes in theatre. Amsterdam: Rodopi. ISBN 978-94-012-1039-3.

=== Chapters ===
- "Spectacle and 'Civil liturgies' in Malta during the time of the Knights of St. John". The Renaissance Theatre: Texts, Performance, Design. Routledge. 1999. ISBN 978-0-429-02643-0.
- Cremona, Vicki Ann; Mejri, Mahmoud (2021). "The Role of Theatre in the Modernisation of Tunisia". In Davis, Tracy C.; Marx, Peter W. (eds.). The Routledge companion to theatre and performance historiography. Routledge Companions. London; New York: Routledge, Taylor & Francis Group. ISBN 978-0-367-52474-6.
- Remshardt, Ralf; Mancewicz, Aneta, eds. (2024). "Malta". The Routledge Companion to Contemporary European Theatre and Performance. London New York: Routledge, Taylor & Francis Group. ISBN 978-1-003-08253-8.

=== Articles ===
- Cremona, Vicki Ann (2008-12-01). "Politics and Identity in Maltese Theatre: Adaptation or Innovation?". TDR/The Drama Review. 52 (4 (200)): 118–144. doi:10.1162/dram.2008.52.4.118. ISSN 1054-2043.
- Cremona, Vicki Ann (April 2016). "Costume in Carnival: Social Performance, Rank and Status". Studies in Costume & Performance. 1 (1). Intellect Ltd.: 77–96. doi:10.1386/scp.1.1.77_1.
- Cremona, Vicki Ann (2020-01-02). "Stanislavski's system: mimesis, truth and verisimilitude". Stanislavski Studies. 8 (1): 23–32. doi:10.1080/20567790.2019.1700735. ISSN 2056-7790.
- "Theatre in Malta: Amateur Practice and Professional Aspirations". Critical Stages/Scènes critiques: The IATC journal/Revue de l'AICT (2020). University of Illinois. 2019-12-16.
- Cremona, Vicki Ann (May 2022). "Empowering Civil Society: The Theatricality of Protest in Malta". New Theatre Quarterly. 38 (2): 125–138. doi:10.1017/S0266464X22000033. ISSN 0266-464X.
