= Inge Kaul =

German development economist (1944–2023)

- Born: 18 August 1944
- Died: 23 January 2023 (aged 78)

Academic background
- Education: Konstanz University (Ph.D. 1972)
- Influences: List: John Maynard Keynes James Tobin John Rawls Amartya Sen Mahbub ul Haq Willy Brandt Richard Musgrave

Academic work
- Discipline: Global public policy Development economics
- Institutions: UNDP (1981–2005); Hertie School of Governance (2007–2023)
- Notable ideas: Global public goods Human development

Inge Kaul (18 August 1944 – 23 January 2023) was a German development economist who was an adjunct professor at the Hertie School of Governance, Berlin, and advisor to various governmental, multilateral and non-profit organizations on policy options to meet global challenges. She specialised in Global public goods, with much of her work looking at international cooperation financing, public-private partnerships, global governance, global issue diplomacy and UN system reform. She was the first director of UNDP's Human Development Report Office, a position which she held from 1989 to 1994, where with Mahbub ul Haq she led the team working on the Human Development Report. She was then director of UNDP's Office of Development Studies from 1995 to 2005. She was the author of numerous publications on international public economics and finance and was the lead editor of the books Providing Global Public Goods: Managing Globalization and The New Public Finance: Responding to Global Challenges.

In 1987 Kaul married U.S. Foreign Service Officer and Ambassador, Edward Hurwitz. They remained married until her death in January 2023 in Berlin.

== Membership in select boards, panels and commissions ==
Inge Kaul had been a member of various select boards, panels and commissions, including:

- Advisory Board, German Development Institute (2014–2023)
- Advisory Board, International Cooperation Council (2015–2023)
- Advisory Board, Journal of Global Policy (2009–2023)
- Advisory Group on Technical Assistance and Cooperation, International Atomic Energy Agency (2008–2011)
- Commission on Macro-economics and Health, Working Groups 2 and 6 (2000–2002)
- Deutsche Gesellschaft für die Vereinten Nationen, Präsidium (2008–2023)
- Editorial Board, Global Governance Journal (2000–2023)
- Expert Group on Financing International Cooperation (2009–2012)
- Governing Board, Global Development Network (2000–2005)
- Governing Board, Economists for Peace and Security (2000–2005)
- GR:EEN (Global Re-Ordering: Evolution through European Networks) (2011–2014)
- Honorary Advisory Committee, International Panel on Social Progress (2015–2023)
- Scientific Advisory Board, Das Progressive Zentrum, Berlin (2010–2023)
- Scientific Advisory Board, Cournot Centre for Economic Research (2003–2008)
- Women in International Security Deutschland (2010–2023)

== Publications ==
=== Selected books ===
- 2016, Global Public Goods, edited by Inge Kaul, published by Edward Elgar, Cheltenham, in the International Library of Critical Writings in Economics series, No. 321, 2016.
- 2006, The New Public Finance; Responding to Global Challenges, edited with Pedro Conceição, Oxford University Press, 2006.
- 2003, Providing Global Public Goods; Managing Globalization, edited with Pedro Conceição et al., Oxford University Press, 2003.
- 1999, Global Public Goods; International Cooperation in the 21st Century, edited with Katell le Goulven et al., Oxford University Press, 1999.
- 1995, The Tobin Tax; Coping with Financial Volatility, edited with Mahbub ul Haq and Isabelle Grunberg., Oxford University Press, 1995.

=== Selected book chapters and papers ===
- 2017, "Providing global public goods: What role for the multilateral development banks?" London: ODI
- 2017, "Warum Globalpolitik? Zur Begründung eines neuen Politikfeldes ". In: Ischinger, Wolfgang and Dirk Messner, eds. 2017. Deutschlands neue Verantwortung. Berlin: Ullstein.
- 2016, "Understanding Global Public Goods: Where We Are and Where to Next". Kaul, Inge, Donald Blondin and Neva Nahtigal. Forthcoming 2016. In: Kaul, Inge, ed. Global Public Goods. Edward Elgar, Cheltenham, UK, Introduction and Overview chapter, pp. xiii-xcii.
- 2016, "Putting Climate Finance into Context: A Global Public Goods Perspective". Kaul, Inge. Forthcoming December 2016. In: Markandya, Anil, Ibon Galarraga and Dirk Rübbelke, eds. Climate Finance. Singapore: World Scientific Publishing.
- 2016, "Making the Case for a New Global Development Agenda – and for New Development Research Priorities". Forthcoming 2016. In: Forum for Development Studies, Vol. 43, No. 3, guest editors: Frederik Söderbaum and Jan Scholte.
- 2016, "Global Public Goods and the United Nations". Kaul, Inge and Donald Blondin. 2016. In: Ocampo, José Antonio, ed. 2016. Global Governance and Development. Chapter 2. Oxford, UK: Oxford University Press.
- 2016, "Financing Global Public Goods: The Case for a Currency Transaction Levy". Nina Hall and Inge Kaul. 2016. In: Scholte, Jan Aart, Lorenzo Fioramonti and Alfred G. Nhema, eds. 2016. New Rules for Global Justice; Structural Redistribution in the Global Economy. Rowman & Littlefield, London, pp. 85–92.
- 2015, "Country Allocations versus Issue Allocations: The Case of Climate Finance". In: Boussichas, Matthieu and Patrick Guillaumont, eds. Financing sustainable Development; Addressing vulnerabilities. Clermont-Ferrand: FERDI, pp. 353–370.
- 2015, "Third Finance for Development Conference", Kaul, Inge / Donald Blondin, Briefing Paper 4/2015, Bonn: German Development Institute / Deutsches Institut für Entwicklungspolitik (DIE)
- 2015, "Solving the Greek Debt", Written by Stephany Griffith-Jones, Financial Markets Director, IPD, at Columbia University and Inge Kaul, adjunct professor, Hertie School of Governance, Berlin, 02/2015
- 2014, "Fostering Sustainable Human Development: Managing the Macro-risks of Vulnerability". New York: UNDP Human Development Report Office, 2014.
- 2014, "The Lacking Realism of the Post-2015 Agenda Process". In: ÖFSE (ed.). 2014. Österreichische Entwicklungspolitik, Analysen, Berichte, Informationen ”Die Post-2015 Agenda. Reform oder Transformation“. Vienna: ÖFSE.
- 2013, "Meeting Global Challenges: Assessing Governance Readiness". In: Anheier, Helmut K., ed. 2013. The Governance Report 2013; Hertie School of Governance; Sovereignty, Fiscal Policy, Innovations, Trade-Offs, Indicators. Oxford: Oxford University Press, pp. 33–58.
- 2013, "Global Public Goods: A concept for framing the Post-2015 Agenda?" Bonn: DIE (Deutsches Institut für Entwicklungspolitik/German Development Institut). Discussion Paper 2/2013.
- 2013, "The Rise of the Global South: Implications for the Provisioning of Global Public Goods", Inge Kaul, 2013.
- 2012, "International Public Finance", Inge Kaul, 2012.
- 2012, "Kapitalismus 4.0 – ein Weg zur nachhaltigen Entwicklung? Oder: Warum wir über eine Mixed Economy 2.1 zum Schutz globaler öffentlicher Güter nachdenken sollten". In: Maring, Matthias, Hrsg. 2012. Globale öffentliche Güter in interdisziplinären Perspektiven. Karlsruhe: KIT Scientific Publishing,2012, pp. 251–266.
- 2012, "Global Public Goods: Explaining Their Underprovision". In: Journal of International Economic Law 15(3), 729–750, 2012.
- 2012, "Public Goods, Global". In: Anheier, Helmut, K., Mark Juergensmeyer, and Victor Faessel, eds. 2012. Encyclopedia of Global Studies. Thousand Oaks, CA: SAGE, 1409–14.
- 2012, "Rethinking Public Goods and Global Public Goods". In: Brousseau, Eric, Tom Dedeurwaerdere, and Bernd Siebenhüner, eds. 2012. Reflexive Governance for Global Public Goods. Cambridge, MA: MIT Press, pp. 37–53.
- 2011, "Global Public Goods and Aid: A dual agenda". In: Berendsen, Bernard, ed. 2011. Common Goods in a Divided World. Amsterdam: KIT Publishers, pp. 43–58.
- 2011, "International Cooperation". In: Work in Progress; 55 Terms for Progress. Madrid: Fundacion Ideas 2011, pp. 121–124.
- 2011, "Public Goods". In: Southerton, Dale, ed. 2011. Encyclopedia of Consumer Culture: Thousand Oaks, CA: SAGE, pp. 1175–1177.
- 2010, "Shaping a new internationalism of enlightened self-interest", policy network essay
- 2010, "The Changing Role of the United Nations: Lessons for Multi-level Governance Beyond the State", in Henrik Enderlein, Sonja Wälti and Michael Zürn (eds.), Handbook on Multi-level Governance, Elgar.
- 2010, "Global public goods and responsible sovereignty". In: The Broker, issue 20/21, July 2010, pp. 22 – 29
- 2009, "Globalisierung gestalten. Vorschläge für eine Zukunfts-befähigende Agenda der Politikinnovation", in: Globart (ed.), Demokratie neu erfinden, Springer Verlag, pp. 66–71.
- 2009, "Global Public Goods", in: Reinert, K. A., R. S. Rajan, A.J. Class and L.S. Davis (eds.), The Princeton Encyclopedia of the World Economy., Princeton University Press, pp. 550–555.
- 2009, "Round table discussion: Economics and climate change—where do we stand and where do we go from here?" with Thomas Schelling, Robert Solow, Nicholas Stern, Thomas Sterner and Martin Weitzman, in: Jean-Philippe Touffut (ed.), Changing Climate, Changing Economy, Edward Elgar, pp. 135–164.
- 2009, "Souveränität und Globalisierung", in: Wolfgang Schröder and Anke Hassel (eds.), Fortschritt jetzt. Ein Handbuch progressiver Ideen für unsere Zeit, Berlin: Progressives Zentrum, pp. 24–27.
- 2008, "What is New About "The New Public Finance?", in Edward Shinnick (ed.), Public Finance, Monetary Policy and Market Issues, LIT: Berlin. (INFER Research Perspectives, vol. 5).
- 2008, "Vom westfälischen Staat zum intermediären Staat, oder: Warum wir einen fairen Multilateralismus brauchen", in: Ditmar Staffelt and Peter Struck (eds.), Deutschland in der Globalisierung; Chancen und Herausforderungen, Keyser Verlag, Berlin.
- 2008, "Responding to Global Challenges; Re-thinking public economics and finance", in: European Commission, Responding to Global Challenges; The Role of Europe and of International Science and Technology Cooperation. Brussels.
- 2008, "Providing (Contested) Global Public Goods.", in Volker Rittberger and Martin Nettelsheim (eds.), Authority in the Changing Political Economy, Palgrave Macmillan.
- 2006, "Global Public Goods", in: Roland Robertson and Jan Aart Scholte (eds.) Encyclopaedia of Globalization, Routledge.
- 2006, "Blending External and Domestic Policy Demands; The Rise of the Intermediary State" in Inge Kaul and Pedro Conceiçāo (eds.), The New Public Finance; Responding to Global Challenges, Oxford University Press.
- 2006, "Exploring the Space between Markets and States; Global Public-Private Partnerships.", in: Inge Kaul and Pedro Conceiçāo (eds.), The New Public Finance; Responding to Global Challenges, Oxford University Press.
- 2006, "Overview", in: Inge Kaul and Pedro Conceiçāo (eds.), The New Public Finance; Responding to Global Challenges, Oxford University Press.
- 2006, "[Une analyse positive des biens publics]", in: Jean-Philippe Touffut (ed.), L'avancée des biens publics; Politique de l'intérêt général et mondialisation., Albin Michel. Collection presented by Robert Solow.

=== Selected joint reports ===
- 2010, Globalizing Solidarity: The Case of Financial Levies, Report of the Committee of Experts to the Task Force on International Financial Transactions and Development. Leading Group on Innovative Financing: Paris, French Ministry of Foreign and European Affairs, 2010.
- 1990, 1991, 1992, 1993 and 1994, Human Development Report, Oxford University Press, UNDP.
