= Global commons =

Concept in political economic theory

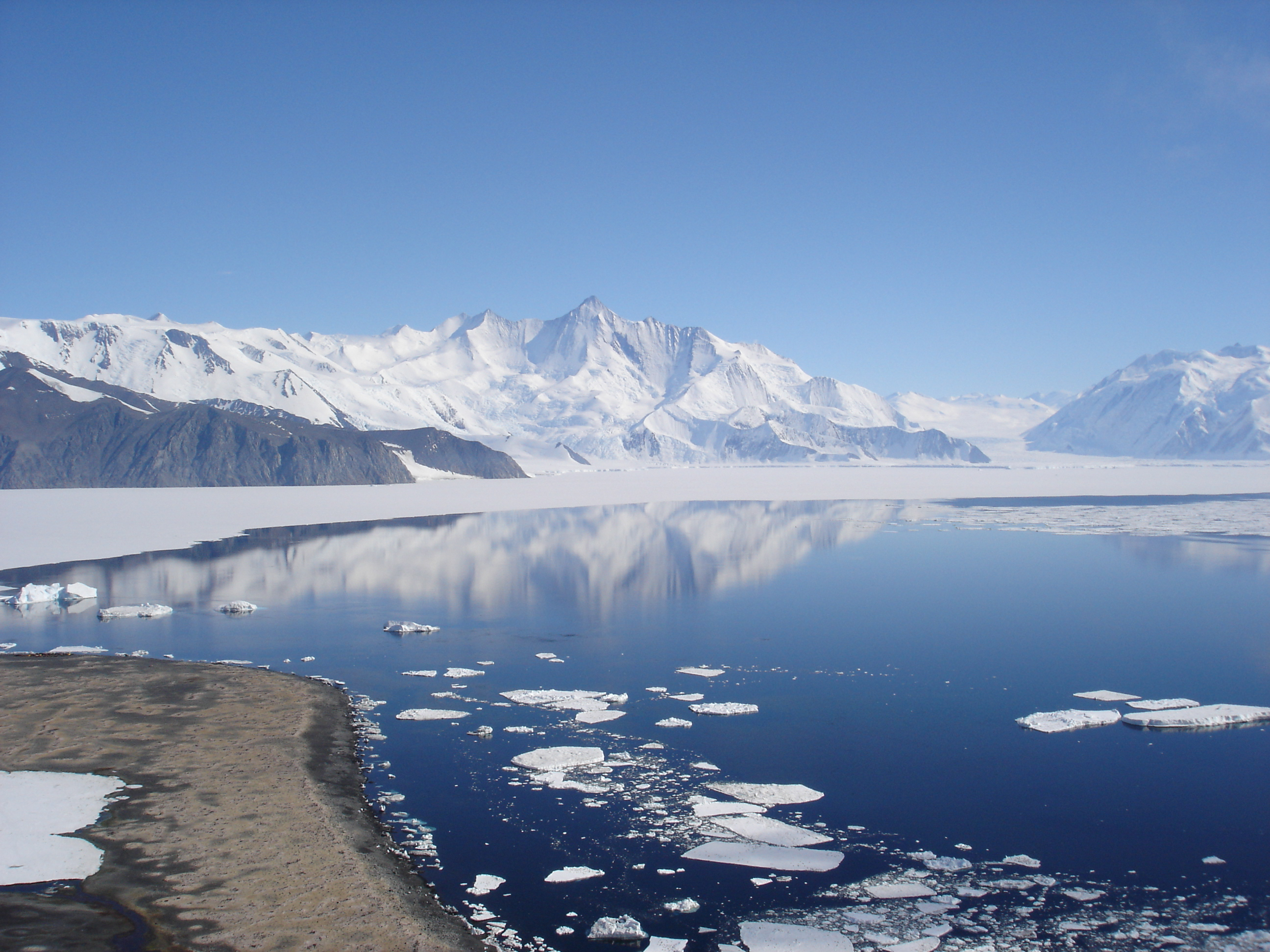
Antarctica is considered to be a global commons.

Global commons is a concept to describe international, supranational, and global resource domains in which common-pool resources are found. They are "areas that lie outside of the political reach of any one nation State". Global commons include the earth's shared natural resources, such as the high seas (international waters), the atmosphere and outer space and the Antarctic in particular. The global commons concept investigates how those shared resources that lie outside of national borders can be managed or governed.

== Definition and usage ==
"Global commons" is a term typically used to describe international, supranational, and global resource domains in which common-pool resources are found. In economics, common goods are rivalrous and non-excludable, constituting one of the four main types of goods. A common-pool resource, also called a common property resource, is a special case of a common good (or public good) whose size or characteristics makes it costly, but not impossible, to exclude potential users. Examples include both natural or human-made resource domains (e.g., a "fishing hole" or an irrigation system). Unlike global public goods, global common-pool resources face problems of congestion, overuse, or degradation because they are subtractable (which makes them rivalrous).

The term "commons" originates from the term common land in the British Isles. "Commoners rights" referred to traditional rights held by commoners, such as mowing meadows for hay or grazing livestock on common land held in the open field system of old English common law. Enclosure was the process that ended those traditional rights, converting open fields to private property. Today, many commons still exist in England, Wales, Scotland, and the United States, although their extent is much reduced from the millions of acres that existed until the 17th century. There are still over 7,000 registered commons in England alone.

According to the World Conservation Strategy, a report on conservation published by the International Union for Conservation of Nature and Natural Resources (IUCN) in collaboration with UNESCO and with the support of the United Nations Environment Programme (UNEP) and the World Wildlife Fund (WWF):

"A commons is a tract of land or water owned or used jointly by the members of a community. The global commons includes those parts of the Earth's surface beyond national jurisdictions — notably the open ocean and the living resources found there — or held in common — notably the atmosphere. The only landmass that may be regarded as part of the global commons is Antarctica ..."

Some refer to the Internet, World Wide Web and resulting cyberspace as global commons. Cyberspace is more commonly called digital commons. Other usages sometimes include references to open access information of all kinds, including arts and culture, language and science, though these are more formally referred to as the common heritage of mankind.

== Management ==
The key challenge of the global commons is the design of governance structures and management systems capable of addressing the complexity of multiple public and private interests, subject to often unpredictable changes, ranging from the local to the global level. As with global public goods, management of the global commons requires pluralistic legal entities, usually international and supranational, public and private, structured to match the diversity of interests and the type of resource to be managed, and stringent enough with adequate incentives to ensure compliance. Such management systems are necessary to avoid, at the global level, the classic tragedy of the commons, in which common resources become overexploited.

There are several key differences in management of resources in the global commons from those of the commons, in general. There are obvious differences in scale of both the resources and the number of users at the local versus the global level. Also, there are differences in the shared culture and expectations of resource users; more localized commons users tend to be more homogeneous and global users more heterogeneous. This contributes to differences in the possibility and time it takes for new learning about resource usage to occur at the different levels. Moreover, global resource pools are less likely to be relatively stable and the dynamics are less easily understood. Many of the global commons are non-renewable on human time scales. Thus, resource degradation is more likely to be the result of unintended consequences that are unforeseen, not immediately observable, or not easily understood. For example, the carbon dioxide emissions that drive climate change continue to do so for at least a millennium after they enter the atmosphere.

Several environmental protocols have been established (see List of international environmental agreements) as a type of international law, "an intergovernmental document intended as legally binding with a primary stated purpose of preventing or managing human impacts on natural resources." International environmental protocols came to feature in environmental governance after trans-boundary environmental problems became widely perceived in the 1960s. Following the Stockholm Intergovernmental Conference in 1972, creation of international environmental agreements proliferated. Due to the barriers already discussed, environmental protocols are not a panacea for global commons issues. Often, they are slow to produce the desired effects, tend to the lowest common denominator, and lack monitoring and enforcement. They also take an incremental approach to solutions where sustainable development principles suggest that environmental concerns should be mainstream political issues.

== Components ==
=== International waters ===
The Law of the Sea is a body of public international law governing relationships between nations in respect to navigational rights, mineral rights, and jurisdiction over coastal waters. Maritime law, also called Admiralty law, is a body of both domestic law governing maritime activities and private international law governing the relationships between private entities which operate vessels on the oceans. It deals with matters including marine commerce, marine navigation, shipping, sailors, and the transportation of passengers and goods by sea.

The United Nations Environment Programme (UNEP) has identified several areas of need in managing the global ocean: strengthen national capacities for action, especially in developing countries; improve fisheries management; reinforce cooperation in semi-enclosed and regional seas; strengthen controls over ocean disposal of hazardous and nuclear wastes; and advance the Law of the Sea. Specific problems identified as in need of attention include Current rising sea levels; contamination by hazardous chemicals (including oil spills); microbiological contamination; ocean acidification; harmful algal blooms; and over-fishing and other overexploitation.

=== Atmosphere ===
The atmosphere is a complex dynamic natural gaseous system that is essential to support life on planet Earth. A primary concern for management of the global atmosphere is air pollution, the introduction into the atmosphere of chemicals, particulates, or biological materials that cause discomfort, disease, or death to humans, damage other living organisms such as food crops, or damage the natural environment or built environment.

Pollution of breathable air is a central problem in the management of the global commons. Pollutants can be in the form of solid particles, liquid droplets, or gases and may be natural or man-made. Although controversial and limited in scope by methods of enforcement, in several parts of the world the polluter pays principle, which makes the party responsible for producing pollution responsible for paying for the damage done to the natural environment, is accepted. It has strong support in most Organisation for Economic Co-operation and Development (OECD) and European Community (EC) countries. It is also known as extended producer responsibility (EPR). EPR seeks to shift the responsibility dealing with waste from governments (and thus, taxpayers and society at large) to the entities producing it. In effect, it attempts to internalise the cost of waste disposal into the cost of the product, theoretically resulting in producers improving the waste profile of their products, decreasing waste and increasing possibilities for reuse and recycling.

The 1979 Convention on Long-Range Transboundary Air Pollution, or CLRTAP, is an early international effort to protect and gradually reduce and prevent air pollution. It is implemented by the European Monitoring and Evaluation Programme (EMEP), directed by the United Nations Economic Commission for Europe (UNECE).

The Montreal Protocol on Substances that Deplete the Ozone Layer, or Montreal Protocol (a protocol to the Vienna Convention for the Protection of the Ozone Layer), is an international treaty designed to protect the ozone layer by phasing out the production of numerous substances believed to be responsible for ozone depletion. The treaty was opened for signature on 16 September 1987, and entered into force on 1 January 1989. The Vienna Convention and Montreal Protocol were widely regarded as highly successful, both in achieving ozone reductions and as a pioneering model for management of the global commons.

Global warming and climate change in general are a major concern of global commons management. The Intergovernmental Panel on Climate Change (IPCC), established in 1988 to develop a scientific consensus, concluded in a series of reports that reducing emissions of greenhouse gases was necessary to prevent catastrophic harm. For example, the IPCC concluded in a 2018 report that dangerous climate change was inevitable unless much greater reductions were promised and carried out.

The 1992 United Nations Framework Convention on Climate Change (FCCC) pledged to work toward "stabilisation of greenhouse gas concentrations in the atmosphere at a level that would prevent dangerous anthropogenic [i.e., human-induced] interference with the climate system" (as of 2019 there were 197 parties to the convention, although not all had ratified it). The 1997 Kyoto Protocol to the FCCC set forth binding obligations on industrialised countries to reduce emissions. It expired in 2012 and was followed by the 2015 Paris Agreement in which nations made individual promises of reductions.

=== Antarctica ===
The Antarctic Treaty and related agreements, collectively called the Antarctic Treaty System or ATS, regulate international relations with respect to Antarctica, Earth's only continent without a native human population. The treaty, entering into force in 1961 and currently having 50 signatory nations, sets aside Antarctica as a scientific preserve, establishes freedom of scientific investigation and bans military activity on that continent.

=== Outer space ===
Management of outer space global commons has been contentious since the successful launch of the Sputnik satellite by the former Soviet Union on 4 October 1957. There is no clear boundary between Earth's atmosphere and space, although there are several standard boundary designations: one that deals with orbital velocity (the Kármán line), one that depends on the velocity of charged particles in space, and some that are determined by human factors such as the height at which human blood begins to boil without a pressurized environment (the Armstrong line).

Space policy regarding a country's civilian space program, as well as its policy on both military use and commercial use of outer space, intersects with science policy, since national space programs often perform or fund research in space science, and also with defense policy, for applications such as spy satellites and anti-satellite weapons. It also encompasses government regulation of third-party activities such as commercial communications satellites and private spaceflight as well as the creation and application of space law and space advocacy organizations that exist to support the cause of space exploration.

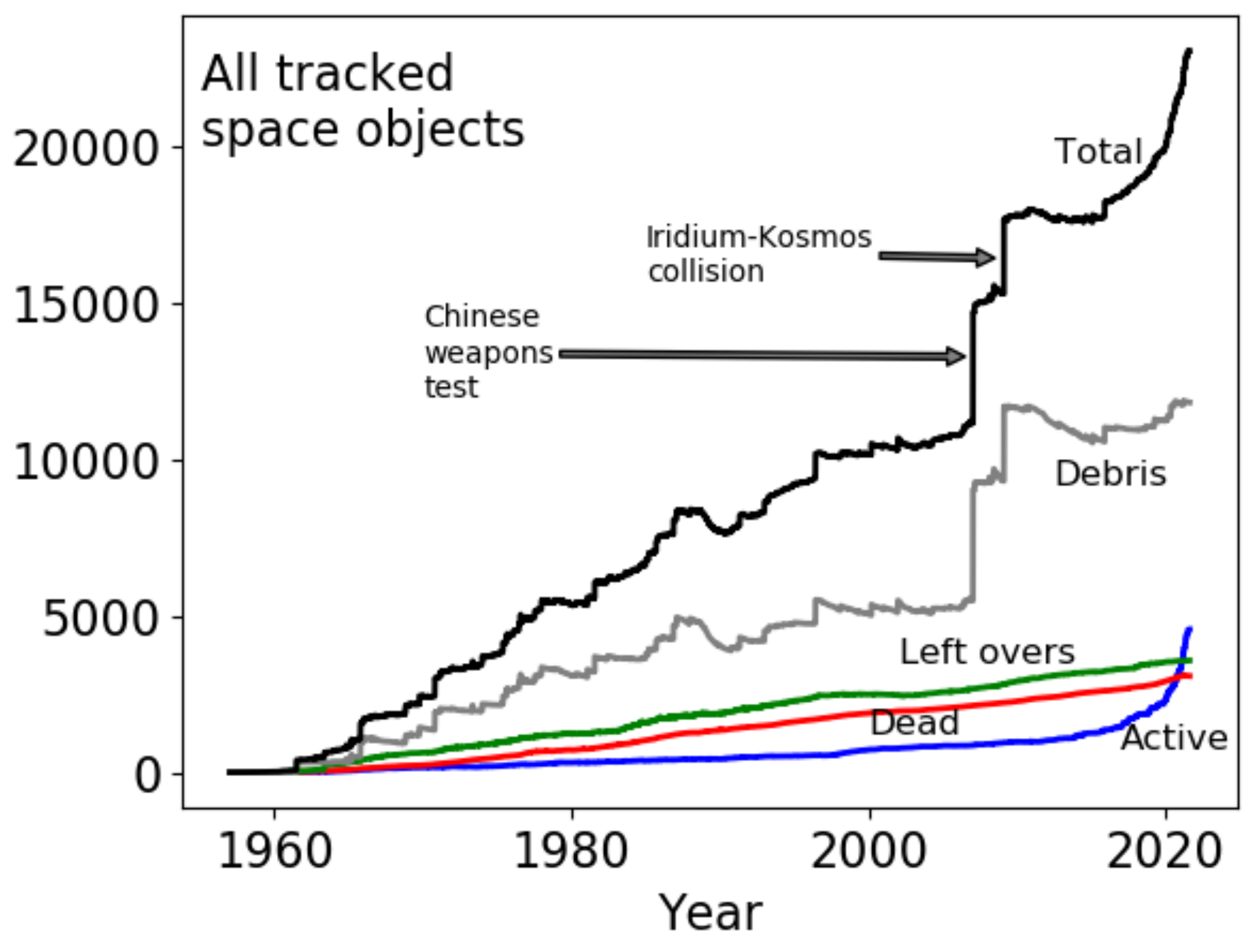
The growth of all tracked objects in space over time

Scientists have outlined rationale for governance that regulates the current free externalization of true costs and risks, treating orbital space around the Earth as part of the global commons – as an "additional ecosystem" or "part of the human environment" – which should be subject to the same concerns and regulations like e.g. oceans on Earth. The study concluded in 2022 that it needs "new policies, rules and regulations at national and international level".

The Outer Space Treaty, signed in 1967, provides a basic framework for international space law. It covers the legal use of outer space by nation states. The treaty states that outer space is free for all nation states to explore and is not subject to claims of national sovereignty. It also prohibits the deployment of nuclear weapons in outer space.

Beginning in 1958, outer space has been the subject of multiple resolutions by the United Nations General Assembly. Of these, more than 50 have concerned the international co-operation in the peaceful uses of outer space and preventing an arms race in space. Four additional space law treaties have been negotiated and drafted by the UN's Committee on the Peaceful Uses of Outer Space. Still, there remain no legal prohibitions against deploying conventional weapons in space and anti-satellite weapons have been successfully tested by the US, USSR and China. The 1979 Moon Treaty turned the jurisdiction of all heavenly bodies (including the orbits around such bodies) over to the international community. However, this treaty has not been ratified by any nation that currently practices crewed spaceflight.

== See also ==
- Digital commons (economics)
- Environmental economics
- Environmental law
- Goods
- Global public goods
- Human ecology
