= Arvid Pardo =

Maltese diplomat and academic (1914–1999)

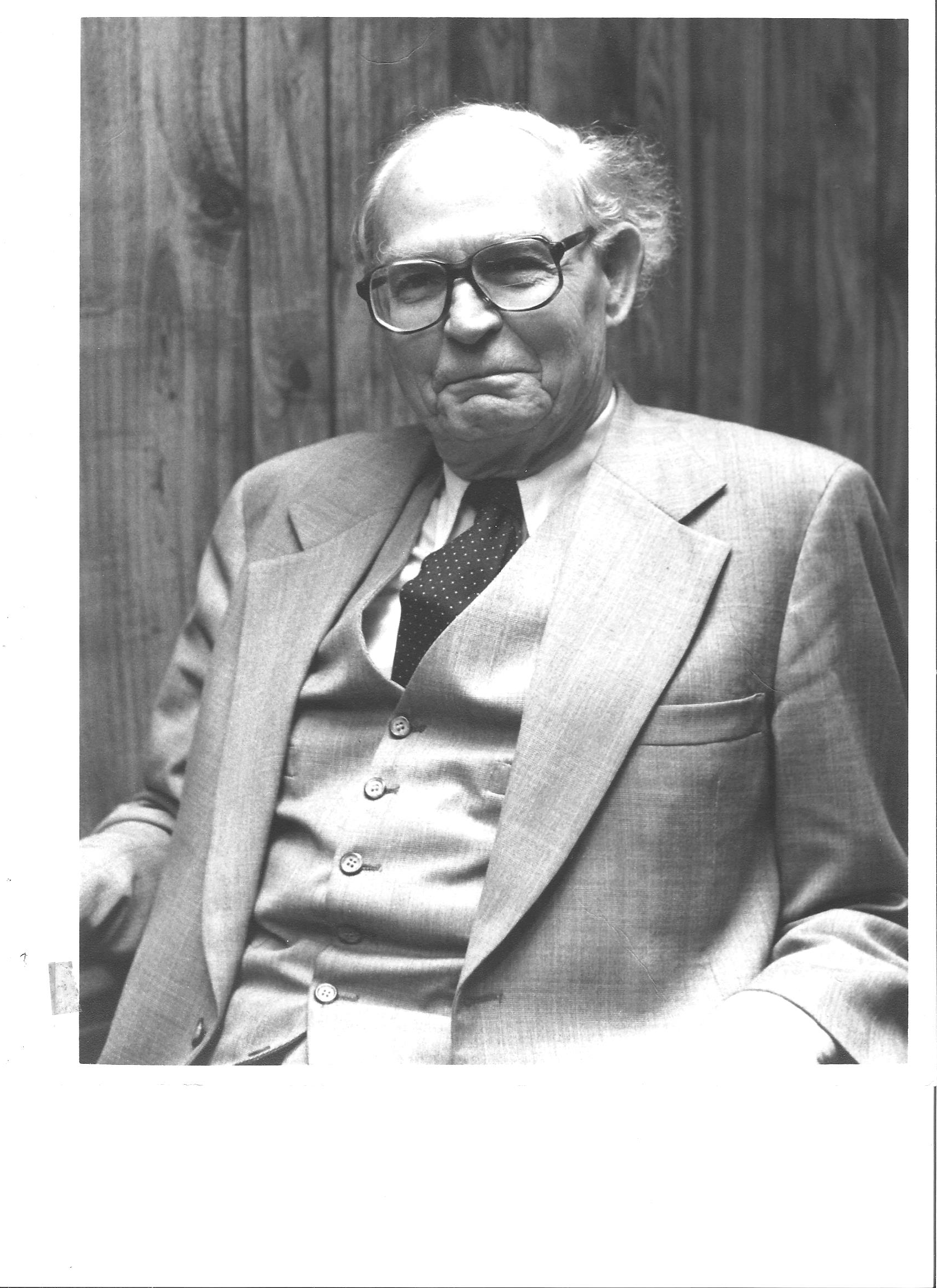
Arvid Pardo, 1975

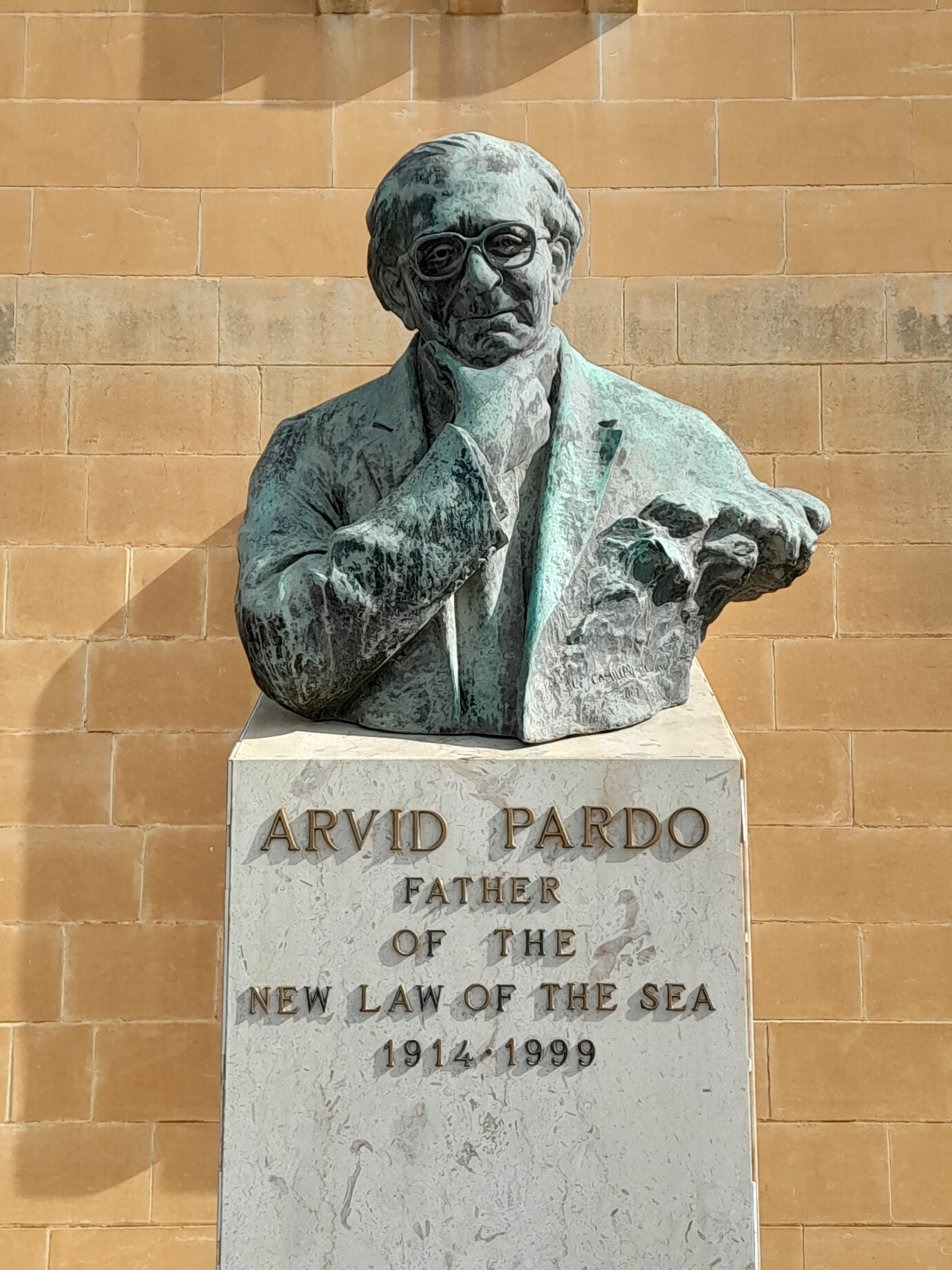
Arvid Pardo monument at the University of Malta

Arvid Pardo (February 12, 1914 – June 19, 1999) was a Maltese and Swedish diplomat, scholar, and university professor. He is known as the Father of the United Nations Convention on the Law of the Sea.

Pardo was born in Rome. His father, Guido Pardo, was born in Malta in 1874 to Enrico Pardo from Livorno. Guido Pardo worked for the International Labour Organization and died of typhus while on a relief mission in the Soviet Union in 1922. His Swedish mother died a year later during an appendectomy and his brother was killed in an automobile accident. He became the ward of a friend of his father, Italian diplomat Bernardo Attolico, who served as Ambassador to Brazil, the Soviet Union, Germany and the Vatican. Attolico sent him to school at Collegio Mondragone, Frascati, and the young Pardo spent his vacations with Attolico at the latter's various diplomatic posts.

Pardo spoke Italian, English, French, Swedish and Spanish fluently, and knew German fairly well. As a student in pre-war Rome, he met Margit Claeson, a Swedish textile designer. In 1947, once his finances were secure, he went to Sweden to find her (they had lost touch during the war) and married her. They had three children: Christina (1949, m. Menez), Lars (1951) and David (1952), all educated in England. His wife and children all outlived him.

Pardo graduated in international law at the University of Rome in 1939. When World War II began, he commenced underground activities as an anti-Fascist organizer but was arrested by the Italian authorities in 1939. After the fall of Benito Mussolini's government, he was freed in September 1943, but was re-arrested at once by the Gestapo and kept in Alexanderplatz and Charlottenburg Prisons in Berlin under a sentence of death. In 1945, as the Red Army approached Berlin, the Swiss officials and the International Committee of the Red Cross arranged his release. After the Soviets entered Berlin, Pardo was arrested again and interrogated. Once released, he crossed the Elbe, walking to the Allied lines, and made contact with British and American forces. He was sent to London, where he arrived penniless.

At first Pardo worked as a dishwasher and waiter in a London restaurant chain until he sought out a friend of his father's, David Owen, who was then helping to set up the United Nations in London. Owen hired him as an assistant in the documentary section, and despite holding a doctorate, he worked as a junior clerk in charge of archives in 1945–6. He then served in the Department of Trusteeship and Non-Self-Governing Territories until 1960. He then joined the Secretariat of the Technical Assistance Board (forerunner of the UNDP) and served as deputy representative in Nigeria and Ecuador, where he was stationed before being selected in 1964 as the first Permanent Representative of Malta to the United Nations by the newly independent country that he had visited only briefly during his life.

During his time as UN delegate, which ended in 1971 after Dom Mintoff's return to office, Pardo's lasting achievement was his work to reform the law of the sea. On 1 November 1967, he made an electrifying speech before the First Committee of General Assembly calling for international regulations to ensure peace at sea, to prevent further pollution and to protect ocean resources. He proposed that the seabed constitutes part of the common heritage of mankind, a phrase that appears in Article 136 of the United Nations Convention on the Law of the Sea. It was Pardo who initiated the fifteen-year process that would culminate in 1982, when the Convention was opened for signatures, and in the early years, he continued a dedicated effort to promote the issue, for instance helping achieve near-unanimous passage of GA Resolution 2749 on December 17, 1970. This resolution embodied principles regarding the seabed and its resources that would later be incorporated into the Convention. Pardo was unhappy with the final instrument's provision for an Exclusive Economic Zone, lamenting that the common heritage of mankind had been whittled down to "a few fish and a little seaweed".

From 1967 to 1971, Pardo was also Malta's Ambassador to the United States. During the same period served as Ambassador to the USSR and was High Commissioner to Canada from 1969 to 1971. He was Malta's representative at the Preparatory Commission of the Law of the Sea conference in 1972 and led the Maltese delegation to the UN Seabed Committee from 1971 to 1973.

From 1972 to 1975 Pardo was coordinator of the ocean studies program at the Woodrow Wilson International Center for Scholars in Washington, D.C. From 1975 to 1990 he was on the USC faculty, teaching political science (1975–81) and international relations (1981–90). For those fifteen years, he was a senior fellow at the Institute of Marine and Coastal Studies.

Pardo was made a Knight of Malta in 1992. He was resident in Seattle when he died there in 1999 (some sources claim he was living in Houston and died there).
