= Common heritage of humanity =

Principle of international law

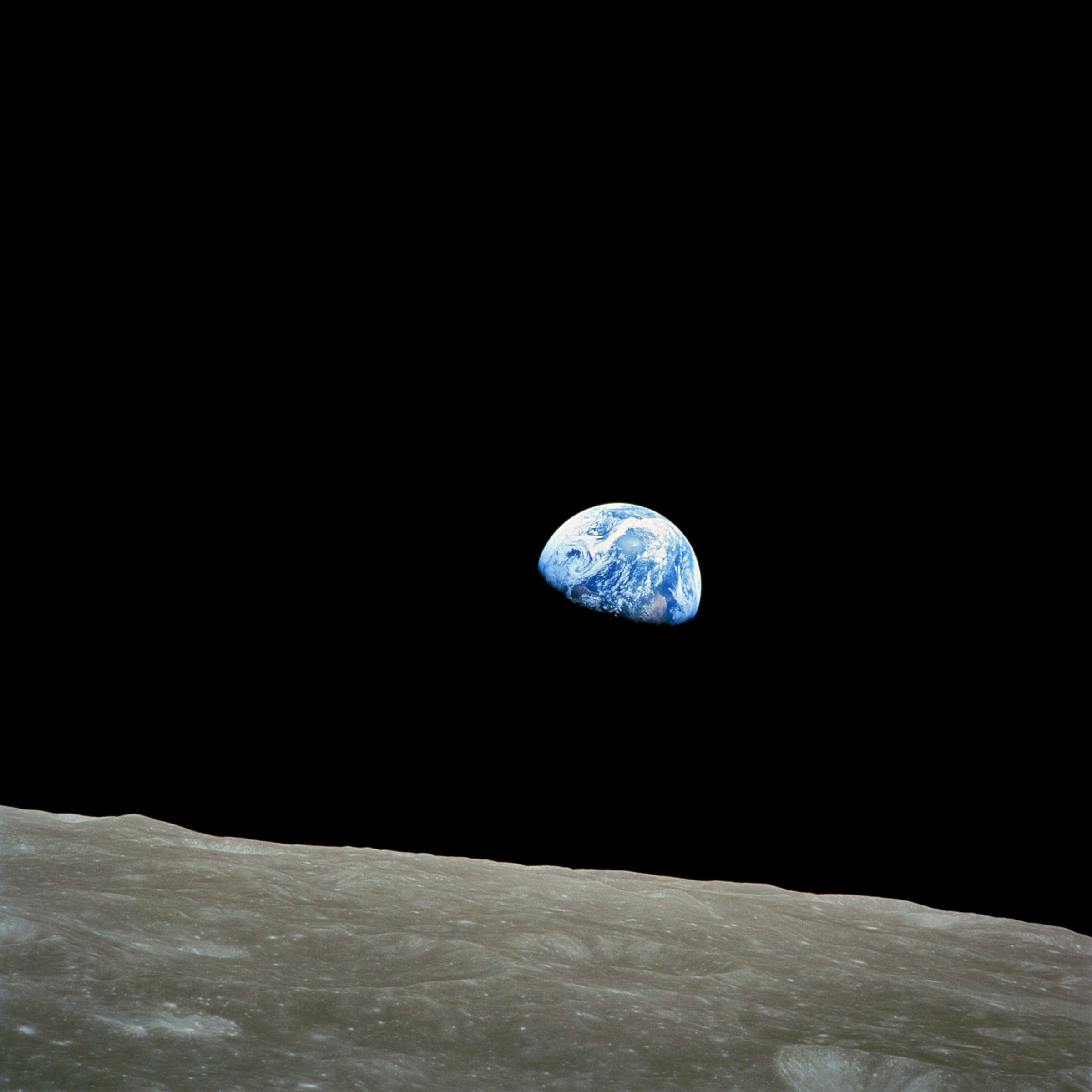
Earthrise, photographed during an orbit of the Moon by William Anders during the 1968 Apollo 8 mission

The common heritage of humanity represents all the skills and achievements of the human race which are held to be shared by all. As a principle of international law, it holds that the defined territorial areas and elements of humanity's common heritage (cultural and natural) should be held in trust for future generations and be protected from exploitation by individual nation states or corporations. Some possible examples include global communication between individuals over the internet, the geostationary orbit and over the high seas.

== Terminology ==
The common heritage of humanity is also termed the general or common heritage of mankind, common heritage of humankind or common heritage principle.

== Origins ==
In tracing the origins of the common heritage principle, it is important to distinguish its history as a term from its conceptual history. The common heritage principle was developed under different names, including common "heritage", common "property", and common "patrimony" of mankind. These terms have at times described different concepts; for instance, in 1813 the "property of mankind" might mean the arts and sciences, rather than items or areas. By the early 20th century, "common heritage" and similar terms usually referred to areas and the resources in them, while other referents had become known under terms like "cultural heritage of all mankind", such as in the preamble to the 1954 Hague Convention for the Protection of Cultural Property in the Event of Armed Conflict.

Conceptually, the common heritage arose in response to the Roman civil law principle of res communis, which described items or areas that anyone could access or use, but none could own. Common heritage instead described areas or items that were owned by humanity as a collective. For example, in his essay Toward Perpetual Peace, Immanuel Kant claimed that the expansion of hospitality with regard to "use of the right to the earth's surface which belongs to the human race in common" would "finally bring the human race ever closer to a cosmopolitan constitution".

The first known use of Common Heritage of Mankind by a state representative in the United Nations, constituting state practice, was at the First UN Conference on the Law of the Sea by Prince Wan Waithayakon of Thailand in 1958. The role of 'mankind' as a legal subject was mentioned in negotiations for the 1967 Outer Space Treaty, and mentions of 'mankind' appear across the space treaties. 'Mankind' as a subject in international law also appears in the Preamble of the United Nations Charter, the Preamble of the North Atlantic Treaty (1949) and the Treaty on the Non-Proliferation of Nuclear Weapons (1968).

== Law of the Sea Treaty ==
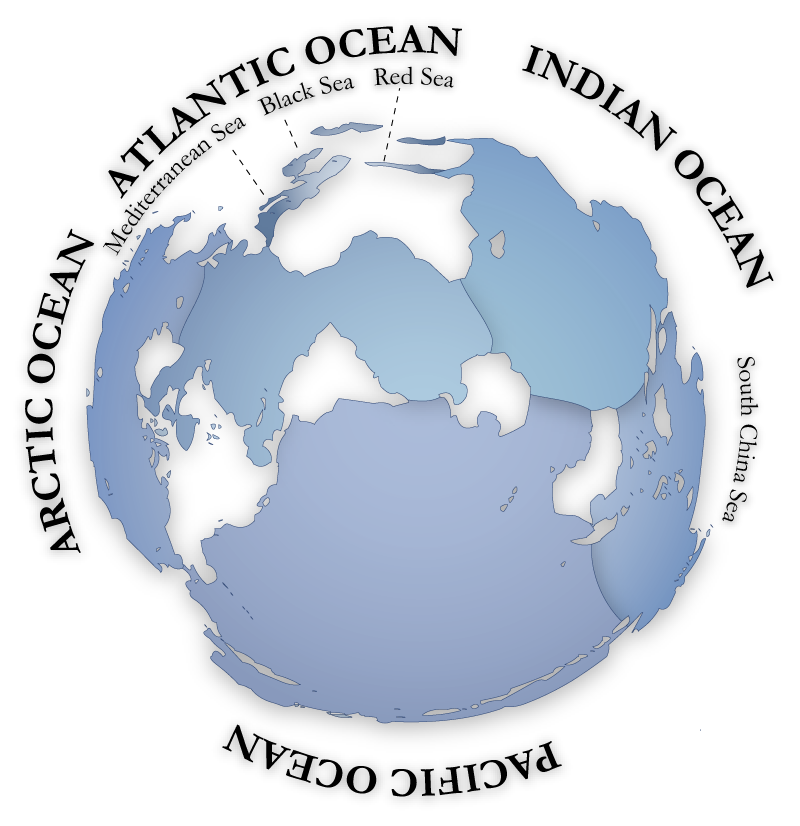
Map of the world's oceans

In 1970, United Nations General Assembly Resolution 2749, the Declaration of Principles Governing the Seabed and Ocean Floor, was adopted by 108 nation states and stated that the deep seabed should be preserved for peaceful purposes and is the "Common Heritage of Mankind."

In 1982, the Common Heritage of Mankind concept was stated to relate to "the seabed and ocean floor and subsoil thereof, beyond the limits of national jurisdiction" under Article 136 of the United Nations Law of the Sea Treaty (UNCLOS).

In his book titled Cries of the Sea: World Inequality, Sustainable Development and the Common Heritage of Humanity, Payoyo argues that the common heritage of humanity principle in Part XI of the Law of the Sea Treaty should favour developing states who were the voice of conscience in establishing it, and not merely in some transient 'affirmative action' manner. He claims, however, that the 1994 Implementation Agreement facilitated control by industrialised countries of the International Seabed Authority (ISA), allowing access by the private sector to the deep sea bed and inhibiting constructive dialogue on sustainable development.

In July 2024, during the International Seabed Authority’s 29th General Assembly, Palau's President Surangel Whipps Jr., in his address entitled "Upholding the Common Heritage of Humankind," emphasized the importance of safeguarding the ocean from exploitation and modern-day colonialism.

== Core conceptual components ==
Former Maltese Ambassador Arvid Pardo, one of the founders of the common heritage of humanity concept under international law, has claimed that it challenges the "structural relationship between rich and poor countries" and represents a "revolution not merely in the law of the sea, but also in international relations". One of the main architects of the principle under international space law has claimed that it is "the most important legal principle achieved by man throughout thousands of years during which law has existed as the regulating element of social exchange". This praise relates to the fact that international law in the common heritage of humanity principle is seeking to protect, respect and fulfill the interests of human beings independently of any politically motivated sovereign state; the concept covering all humans wherever they are living, as well as future generations.

Jennifer Frakes has identified five core components of the Common Heritage of Humanity concept. First, there can be no private or public appropriation; no one legally owns common heritage spaces. Second, representatives from all nations must manage resources contained in such a territorial or conceptual area on behalf of all since a commons area is considered to belong to everyone; this practically necessitating a special agency to coordinate shared management. Third, all nations must actively share with each other the benefits acquired from exploitation of the resources from the commons heritage region, this requiring restraint on the profit-making activities of private corporate entities; this linking the concept to that of global public good. Fourth, there can be no weaponry or military installations established in territorial commons areas. Fifth, the commons should be preserved for the benefit of future generations, and to avoid a "tragedy of the commons" scenario. Academic claims have been made that where the principle requires the establishment of an international resource management regime, prior to establishment of such a regime a moratorium on resource exploitation should be enforced. Such a position does not appear to have been supported by most states during the respective drafting negotiations.

Limits of national (territorial) jurisdiction and sovereignty
Outer space (including Earth orbits; the Moon and other celestial bodies, and their orbits)
national airspace		territorial waters airspace	contiguous zone airspace	international airspace		
land territory surface	internal waters surface	territorial waters surface	contiguous zone surface	Exclusive Economic Zone surface	international waters surface	
internal waters		territorial waters	Exclusive Economic Zone		international waters	
land territory underground		Continental Shelf surface			extended continental shelf surface	international seabed surface
land territory underground		Continental Shelf underground			extended continental shelf underground	international seabed underground

full national jurisdiction and sovereignty
restrictions on national jurisdiction and sovereignty
international jurisdiction per common heritage of mankind

== World Heritage Conventions ==
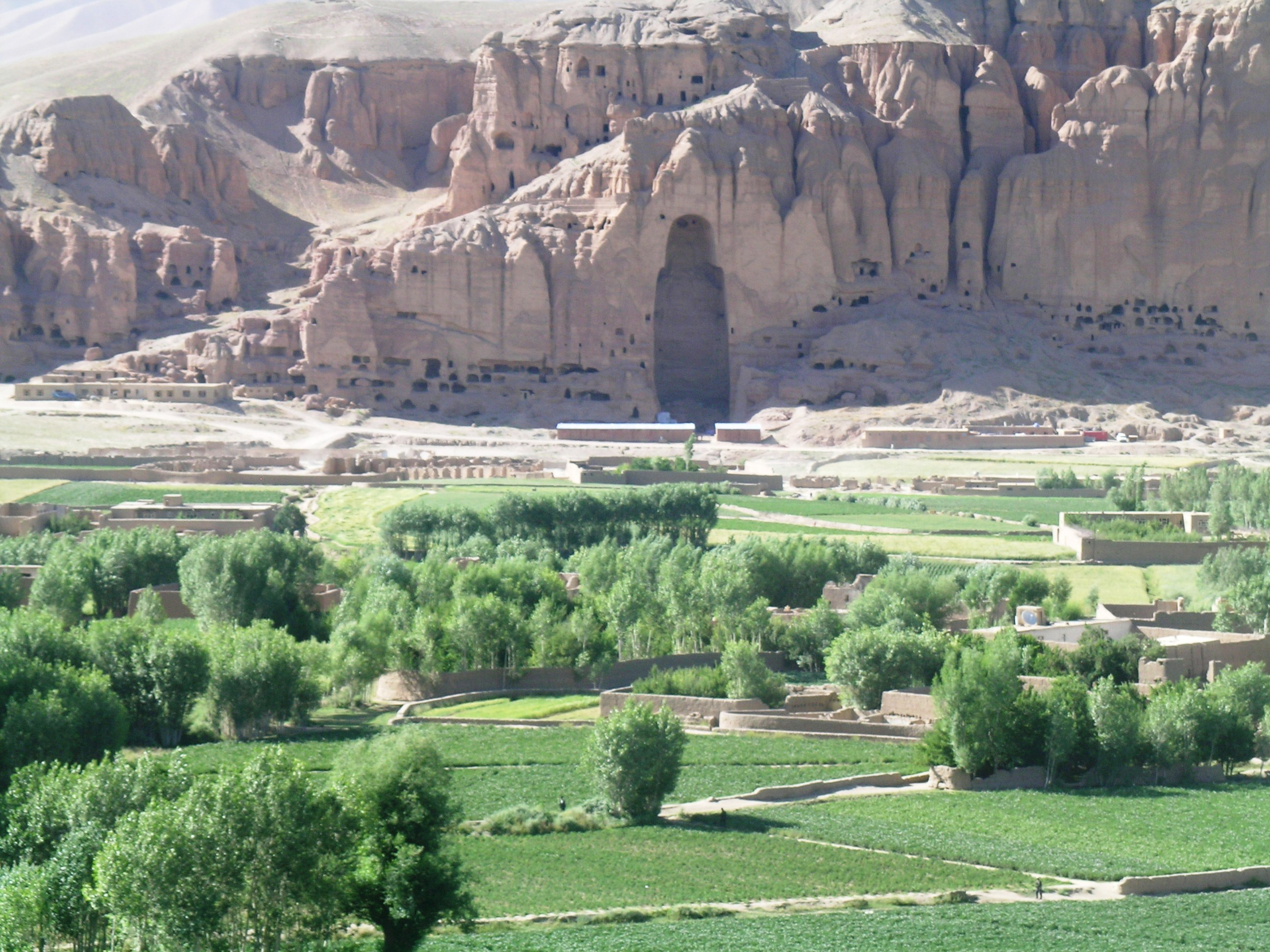
Bamian Valley - UNESCO World Heritage-listed site in Afghanistan, showing destroyed Buddha statue

A similar principle of international law holds that the world's cultural and natural heritage (as nominated for listing by nation states) must be protected by states parties to the UNESCO World Heritage Convention.

A case study in the use of these provisions was provided by the Franklin Dam non-violent protest campaign against the construction of a dam of Australia's last wild river; they being held by the Australian High Court to provide a valid basis for legislation protecting the Franklin River. Justice Lionel Murphy wrote in that case (Commonwealth v Tasmania) about the Common Heritage of Humanity principle: "The preservation of the world's heritage must not be looked at in isolation but as part of the co-operation between nations which is calculated to achieve intellectual and moral solidarity of mankind and so reinforce the bonds between people which promote peace and displace those of narrow nationalism and alienation which promote war ... [t]he encouragement of people to think internationally, to regard the culture of their own country as part of world culture, to conceive a physical, spiritual and intellectual world heritage, is important in the endeavour to avoid the destruction of humanity."

== UNESCO Universal Declaration on the Human Genome and Human Rights ==
The UNESCO Universal Declaration on the Human Genome and Human Rights declares in Article 1 that: "The human genome underlies the fundamental unity of all members of the human family, as well as the recognition of their inherent dignity and diversity. In a symbolic sense, it is the heritage of humanity." Article 4 states: "The human genome in its natural state shall not give rise to financial gains." Such Declarations do not create binding obligations under international law (unless over time there is sufficient opinio juris and state practise to make them part of international customary law) so the impact of such principles of commercialisation of the human genome will be problematic. Whether the principle prohibits the patenting of the human genome is contested by the corporate sector.

== UNESCO Declaration on the Responsibilities of the Present Generations Towards Future Generations ==
Proclaimed on November 12, 1997, the UNESCO Declaration on the Responsibilities of the Present Generations Towards Future Generations is an international agreement (potentially part of international customary law) which includes provisions related to the common heritage of mankind.

'The present generations have the responsibility to bequeath to future generations an Earth which will not one day be irreversibly damaged by human activity. Each generation inheriting the Earth temporarily should take care to use natural resources reasonably and ensure that life is not prejudiced by harmful modifications of the ecosystems and that scientific and technological progress in all fields does not harm life on Earth.'

— UNESCO, Declaration on Future Generations Article 4

'With due respect for human rights and fundamental freedoms, the present generations should take care to preserve the cultural diversity of humankind. The present generations have the responsibility to identify, protect and safeguard the tangible and intangible cultural heritage and to transmit this common heritage to future generations.'

— UNESCO, Declaration on Future Generations Article 7

'The present generations may use the common heritage of humankind, as defined in international law, provided that this does not entail compromising it irreversibly.'

— UNESCO, Declaration on Future Generations Article 8

'1. The present generations should ensure that both they and future generations learn to live together in peace, security, respect for international law, human rights and fundamental freedoms.
2. The present generations should spare future generations the scourge of war. To that end, they should avoid exposing future generations to the harmful consequences of armed conflicts as well as all other forms of aggression and use of weapons, contrary to humanitarian principles.'

— UNESCO, Declaration on Future Generations Article 9

== United Nations Declaration on the Rights of Indigenous Peoples ==
The declaration affirms in its preamble that Indigenous Peoples contribute to humanity's common heritage.

== Potential applications ==
It was argued at the World Summit on the Information Society and has been advocated by academics that global communication between individuals over the internet should be regarded as part of the Common Heritage of Mankind. Equatorial countries have proposed that the geostationary orbit over the high seas should be declared the common heritage of mankind.

== Controversies about the principle ==
Kemal Baslar has stated that the Common Heritage of Mankind principle "is a philosophical idea that questions the regimes of globally important resources regardless of their situation, and requires major changes in the world to apply its provisions. In other words, the application and enforcement of the common heritage of mankind require a critical reexamination of many well-established principles and doctrines of classical international law, such as acquisition of territory, consent-based sources of international law, sovereignty, equality, resource allocation and international personality".

The common heritage of humanity principle in international law has been viewed as one solution to the tragedy of the commons dilemma described in an influential article by that name written by Garrett Hardin in the journal Science in 1968. The article critically analyzes a dilemma in which multiple individuals, acting independently after rationally consulting self-interest, ultimately destroy a shared limited resource even when each acknowledges that outcome is not in anyone's long-term interest. Hardin's conclusion that commons areas are practicably achievable only in conditions of low population density and so their continuance requires state restriction on the freedom to breed, created controversy particularly through his deprecation of the role of conscience in achieving justice and equality in society. Hardin's views have been noted by scholars and policy-makers supporting privatization of common spaces and suggesting economic rationalism on such social and ecosystems.

The extent to which the Common Heritage of Mankind principle does or should control the activities of private multinational corporations as well as nation states, particularly with regard to mining activities, remains controversial. Least developed nations often see the principle as a means of protecting critical resources from exploitation by capitalist nations and their corporations. As world oil, coal and mineral reserves are depleted there will be increasing pressure to commercially exploit Common Heritage of Mankind areas. It appears at the present time that exploration of outer space is unlikely to initially proceed under the jurisdiction of a supranational organization, but rather through the coordination of national space programs. It has been argued that photosynthesis in its natural or artificial forms should be considered the common heritage of humanity.

== See also ==
- Cultural property law
- Declaration of Human Duties and Responsibilities
- Global commons
- Global public good
- Space archaeology
- World Heritage Site
- Common ownership
- Adverse abandonment
- Usufruct
- Earth jurisprudence
- Rights of nature
- List of territories governed by the United Nations
