= Emmanuel Agius =

Maltese philosopher

- Born: 1954 (age 71–72); Mqabba, Malta
- Occupation: Philosophy

Emmanuel Agius (born 1954) is a Maltese minor philosopher mostly specialised and interested in ethics.

== Early life and education ==
Agius was born at Mqabba, Malta, in 1954. He studied at the University of Malta from where he acquired a Bachelor's degree and a Licentiate in Theology (1979). Subsequently, he studied in Belgium at the University of Leuven from where he acquired a Master's degree in philosophy and a Doctorate degree in Theology (1986). Afterwards, he studied bioethics first as a Research Fellow of Alexander-von-Humboldt Stiftung at the University of Tübingen in Germany, then as a Fulbright Scholar at the National Reference Library of Bioethics at Georgetown University in Washington D.C. (United States), and finally, having been awarded a Theodore M. Hesburgh Scholarship, at the University of Notre Dame, Indiana, (also in the U.S.).

== Career ==
Agius began teaching moral theology at the University of Malta. Later he taught bioethics, moral philosophy, moral theology, and professional ethics at under-graduate and graduate levels. He was appointed Dean of the Faculty of Theology in 2007.

Agius was former member of the Council of Europe's Steering Committee on Bioethics (CDBI). He has been Member of the European Group on Ethics in Science and New Technologies (EGE) since 2005. He is also Member of the National Consultative Bioethics Committee (Ministry of Health), of the Research Ethics Committee (Faculty of Medicine), and of the Health Ethics Committee on Clinical Trials (Ministry of Health); Ethical evaluator for the European Commission in FP6; participates in projects of Organization for Security and Co-operation in Europe /ODIHR and UNESCO; Coordinator of the Future Generations Programme at the Foundation for International Studies of the University of Malta; Coordinator of the Euro-Mediterranean Programme on Intercultural Dialogue, Human Rights and Future Generations, also at the Foundation for International Studies, a programme supported by UNESCO; Member of editorial boards of international journals on bioethics, moral philosophy and theology; and Member of the Scientific Committee of the Centro di Ateneo di Bioetica at the Catholic University of the Sacred Heart of Milan, Italy.

== Works ==
Books

- 1984 – A Social Ethical Theory based on Process Philosophy.
- 1986 - The Rights of Future Generations: In Search of an Intergenerational Ethical Theory.
- 1990 - Our Responsibilities Towards Future Generations (co-edited with Salvino Busuttil, Peter Serracino Inglott and Tony Macelli).
- 1991 - The Social Consciousness of the Church in Malta: 1891-1921.
- 1991 - Mit-Tnissil sal-Mewt tal-Bniedem: L-aħħar Zviluppi fil-Bioetika (From Conception to the Death of Man: The most recent developments in bioethics).
- 1994 - What future for Future Generations (co-edited with Salvino Busuttil).
- 1994 - Problems in Applied Ethics.
- 1998 - Caring for Future Generations: Jewish, Christian, Islamic Perspectives.
- 1998 - Future Generations and International Law (co-edited with Salvino Busuttil).
- 1998 - Germ-line Intervention and Our Responsibilities to Future Generations (co-edited with Salvino Busuttil).

Articles

- 1988 – 'From Individual Rights to Collective Rights to the Rights of Mankind', in Melita Theologica.
- 1989 – 'Caring for the Elderly and Malta's National Health Scheme', in Hastings Centre Report.
- 1989 – 'Towards a Relational Theory of Intergenerational Ethics', in Bijdragen.
- 1989 – 'Theology and Bioethics', in The dove in the owl's nest.
- 1989 – 'Germ-line Cells: Our Responsibilities to Future Generations', in Ethics in the Natural Sciences (Concilium), ed. by D. Mieth & J. Pohier.
- 1990 – 'From individual to collective rights to the rights of mankind', in Our Responsibilities towards Future Generations, ed. by Emmanuel Agius et al.
- 1990 – 'Towards a relational theory of intergenerational ethics', in Our Responsibilities towards Future Generations, ed. by Emmanuel Agius et al.
- 1990 – 'Germ-line cells' in Our Responsibilities towards Future Generations, ed. by Emmanuel Agius et al.
- 1991 – 'Infertility and Artificial Reproduction', in Weddings and Homes.
- 1991 – 'The Concept of the Common Heritage of Mankind in the Catholic Social Tradition', in Melita Theologica.
- 1992 – 'Ethical Issues of Routine Universal Screening', in Proceedings of the U.G.M.D. Seminar on Screening for Blood Transmissible Disease.
- 1993 – 'Our Responsibilities towards Future Generations: Malta's Contribution', in Quaderni di Bioetica e Cultura.
- 1994 – 'Patenting life', in What Future for Future Generations?, ed. by E. Agius and S. Busuttil.
- 1994 – 'Meaning and sanctity of aging', in The Sanctity of Life.
- 1994 – 'Autoerotismo' (Auto-Erotism), in Dizionario di Bioetica, ed. by (S. Leone and S. Provitera.
- 1994 – 'The Ethical Challenges of AIDS', in Proceedings of the National Conference on AIDS.
- 1994 – 'Generazioni Future' (Future Generations), in Dizionario di Bioetica, ed. by S. Leone and S. Privitera.
- 1994 – 'The 'Quality of Life' of Future Generations: What Kind of Responsibility Do we Have?', in Why Future Generations Now?.
- 1994 – 'La qualià della vità delle generazioni future: quale tipo di responsibiltà abbiamo?' (The quality of life of future generations: what kind of responsibilities do we have?), in Il Contesto Culturale dell'Etica della Vita, ed. by S. Leone and S. Privitera.
- 1994 – 'Meaning and Sanctity of Aging: New Trends in Public Policy', in Quaderni di Bioetica e Cultura.
- 1994 – 'Meaning and Sanctity of Aging: New Trends in Public Policy', in Bioetica e Cultura.
- 1995 – 'AIDS: sfida etico-sociale e prodlemi educative', in AIDS. Problemi sanitari, sociali e morali, ed. by Salvatore Leone.
- 1995 – 'Genes as the common heritage of mankind: Ethical Issues in patenting life', in Bioetica, ed. by Carlo Romano and Goffrendo Grassani.
- 1996 – 'Qualità della vita nel Mediterraneo: Prospettiva cattolica' (Quality of life in the Mediterranean: a Catholic perspective), in Bioetica mediterraneeo e nordeuropa, ed. by S. Privitera.
- 1997 – 'The Rights of Future Generations', Interfaces, ed. by (J. Friggieri.
- 1998 – 'Obligations of Justice towards Future Generations: A Revolution in Social and Legal Thought', in Future Generations and International Law, ed. by E. Agius and S. Busuttil.
- 1998 – 'Patenting life', in What Future for Future Generations?, ed. by E. Agius and S. Busuttil.
- 1998 – 'Quale futuro per le generazioni future del mediterraneo?' (What future do Mediterranean future generations have?), in Bioetica e Cultura.
- 1998 – 'Patenting Life: Our Responsibilities to Present and Future Generations', in Germ-line Intervention and Our Responsibilities to Future Generations, ed. by E. Agius.
- 1998 – 'Informed Consent: Ethical and Philosophical Issues', in Informed Consent: Proceedings of a Symposium for Medical and Paramedical Practitioners, ed. by M.N. Cauchi.
- 1999 – 'Bioethics and Disability', in Proceedings of the Conference on Bioethics and Disability, ed. by M.N. Cauchi.
- 1999 – 'What Future for Future Generations: A Whiteheadian Perspective', in Framing a Vision of the World: Essays in Philosophy, Science and Religion, ed. by A. Cloots and S. Sia.
- 2000 – 'Morality and Public Policy' in Patients' Rights, Reproductive Technology, Transplantation, ed. by M. Cauchi.
- 2000 – 'Un Patto tra le Generazioni' (An agreement between generations), in Etica per le Professioni.
- 2002 – 'The Rights of the Dying Patient', in Bioethical Issues at the Beginning and End of Life, ed. by M.N Cauchi.
- 2002 – 'Withholding and Withdrawing Treatment: Ethics at the Bedside', in Bioethical Issues at the Beginning and End of Life, ed. by M.N Cauchi.
- 2003 – 'Intergenerational Justice', in Encyclopedia of Life Support Systems, ed. by Richard. R. Ernst.
- 2003 – 'Towards a Culture of Tolerance and Peace', in website of the International Bureau for Children's Rights of Canada.
- 2003 – 'Alla ricerca di un approccio europeo alla bioetica' (Towards the search of a European approach to bioethics), in Bioetica e Cultura XII.
- 2003 – 'In Search of a European Approach to Bioethics: The Emergence of a Common Euro-Mediterranean Bioethical Culture', in Ethical Issues in Practice for Nurses, Midwives and Family and Family Medicine, ed. by M.N. Cauchi.
- 2003 – 'Ethical Challenges of the Future for the Nursing Profession', in Ethical Issues in Practice for Nurses, Midwives and Family and Family Medicine, ed. by M.N. Cauchi.
- 2003 – 'Il-Hajja bhala Rigal minghand Alla: l-Ulied' (Life as a gift from God: soms and daughters), in Il-Familja Nisranija fil-ħajja tal-lum.
- 2004 – 'In Search of a European Approach to Bioethics: The Emergence of a Common Euro-Mediterranean Bioethical Culture', in In Joyful and Serene Service of his Lord's Word, ed. by A. Abela.
- 2006 – 'Integration Justice' in Handbook of Intergeneration Justice, ed. by Joerg Chet Tremmel.
- 2006 – 'Environmental Ethics: Towards Intergenerational Justice', in Environmental Ethics and International Policy, ed. by Henk ten Have.
- 2007 – 'La biotecnologia e la dimensione intergenerazionale della soggesttività' (Bio-technology and the intergenerational dimension of subjectivity), in Nuove Bio-Tecnologie, Biodiritto e Transformazione Della Soggettività, ed. by Laura Palazzan.
- 2007 – 'Disbilità, Bioetica e Diritti Umani: Una prospettiva Euro-Mediterranean' (Disability, Bioethics, and Human Rights: a Euro-Mediterranean perspective), Proceedings of the Third International Congress: Towards a New Humanism, Ethics and Disability, ed. by M. Camozzino and P. Ruffinatto.
- 2008 – 'Do Future Generations have Rights?', in Maltese Perspectives on Human Rights, ed. by D.E. Zammit.
- 2008 – 'Environmental Responsibility and Business Styles: Ethical and Theological Perspectives', in Business Styles and Sustainable Development, ed. by L. Mariani et al..
- 2008 – 'Precauzione tra presente e futuro' (Precautions between present and future), in Il Principio di Precauzione. Tra Filosofia, Biodiritto e Biopolitica, ed. by Luca Marini and Laura Palazzani.
- 2008 – 'Esperienze didattiche a confronto: l'Università di Malta' (Dialectical experiences confronted), in L'educazione alla bioetica in Europa, ed. by Poalo Girolami.
- 2009 – 'Bioetica e disabilità' (Bioethics and disability), in Bioetica e Cultura.
- 2009 – 'Human Embryo Research and Dignitas Personae: A European Perspective', in ßio-ethos.

== See also ==
- Philosophy in Malta

== Sources ==
- Mark Montebello, Il-Ktieb tal-Filosofija f’Malta (A Source Book of Philosophy in Malta), PIN Publications, Malta, 2001.
- Mark Montebello, Malta’s Philosophy & Philosophers, PIN Publications, Malta, 2011.
