= Medal of Merit (Malta) =

The Medal of Merit is a Maltese medal established by the Confederation of (Maltese) Civic Councils, and handed out in the years 1968–1971. It should not be confused with the Malta National Order of Merit as established by an Act of Parliament (see below). The Medal of Merit was eventually replaced by the Ġieħ ir-Repubblika.

== Origin of the Medal ==
From the 1950s, up to the early 1970s many localities in Malta had set up a Council made up from representatives of all the organisations/societies within their locality. These councils were non-partisan and more often than not both major political parties used to be represented. It must be said that the administration (both political and the Civil Service) did not fully welcome such activities as the Councils were seen to interfere in their decisions.

In the 1960s, the majority of Councils decided to organise a Confederation of Civic Councils. This gave the individual Councils more muscle power. The Confederation wanted to be pro-active and one idea was to establish a National Honour to show the nation's appreciation to certain persons who would have made a name through their activities.

== Awards committee ==
With the backing of the confederation, the secretary, Mr Francis (Frans) Said approached The Hon. Mr Justice Professor J.J. Cremona, who at that time was the vice president of the constitutional court and the court of appeal. Professor Cremona was also a judge on the European Court of Human Rights. (Later Professor John J. Cremona was appointed chief justice). With such a personality who accepted to act as chairman of the award committee, they approached other personalities to serve on the committee. Apart from both of them, these included Dr G. Borg PhC, MD; Professor G. Galea, MBE, KM, MD, DPH, FRSH, Mr J. Dalli and Mr A Farrugia.

The design of the medal was carried out by the renowned artist Emvin Cremona. The eventual medals were cast in bronze by the Firm Francis Abela & Sons who also used to carry out the plating in gold or silver. All those concerned did their work free of charge as the Confederation did not have any particular funds.

The award committee decided that there should be three types of medals, namely gold for exceptional service, silver for merited services and bronze for laudable services. It was also decided that the announcement of the recipients was to be made on the 21 September (Independence Day) of each year, considering that at that time it was the National Day.

== Awards ==
The first awards were announced on September 21, 1968, to three personalities that had made their name not only in Malta but even more so around the world.

The general reaction was very positive. A second set of medals were awarded in 1969. In 1970 the committee started to face a certain amount of flack as there were those that felt that the Confederation was aiming too high. Professor Cremona argued the case, but the committee still missed the 1970 announcement. Therefore, in 1971 the committee announced two gold medals. Also, in an effort to avoid political implications, the 1971 awards were announced on the 8 September (Victory Day), which once again had become Malta's National Day.

== Demise of the medal ==
That was the last of the Medal of Merit. In 1971 there was a change of government and certain elements within it were against all Civic Councils, even though this was not the official position. To be fair, the previous administration never accepted them in full, but at least they were allowed to operate. The collapse of the individual Councils meant the demise of the Confederation and in turn also of the Medal of Merit. Professor Cremona together with Frans Said discussed this topic at very high levels, but to no avail. They wanted that the award would be incorporated on an official level. While the government accepted the need for a national award, they had been told that it was planning to expand on their work and establish its own award system.

In 1975, the government kept its promise and introduced an updated and more extensive award system that was established through the Ġieħ ir-Repubblika Act, which was further consolidated in 1990 by the foundation of the National Order of Merit under the same Act. Three of the recipients were eventually also included within the National Order of Merit.

== Recipients of the Medal of Merit ==
=== 1968 ===
- Gold – Prof. Joseph E. Debono (medical research) (deceased)
- Silver – Mr. Joseph Attard Kingswell (trade unionist)* (deceased)
- Silver – Mgr. Michael Azzopardi (philanthropist) (deceased)
- Bronze – Mr. Guido Lanfranco (folklore studies)***

=== 1969 ===
- Gold – His Lordship Bishop E. Galea, Vicar General (deceased)
- Silver – Mr. A. Cremona (author of many works) (deceased)
- Bronze – Mr. M. A. Delia, (botanist and president of the Malta Band Clubs Assoc.) (deceased)

=== 1971 ===
- Gold – Chev. E. V. Cremona (artist) (deceased)
- Silver – Mro. Carmelo Pace (musician)** (deceased)
- Silver – Dr. Paul Cassar (medical history) (deceased)
- Bronze – Mr. J. M. Cassar Naudi (referee & family welfare officer)

*Member of the National Order of Merit (MOM) 1992
**Officer of the National Order of Merit (UOM) 1992
***Medal for Services to the Republic 1996
