= Global public good =

Public good available worldwide

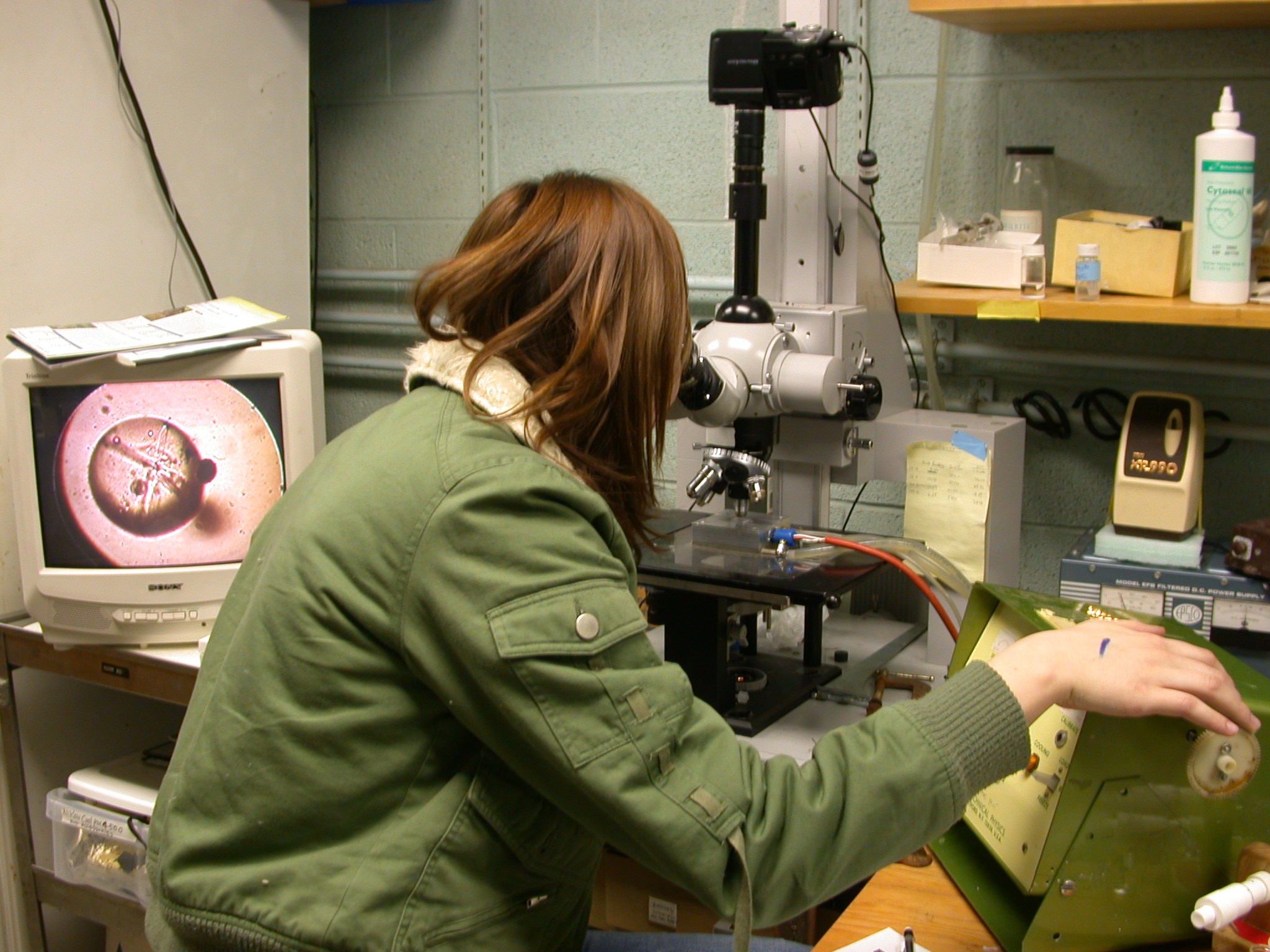
The knowledge production of scientific researchers, which helps advance everyone's understanding and well-being, is an example of a global public good.

In traditional usage, a global public good (or global good) is a public good available on a more-or-less worldwide basis. There are many challenges to the traditional definition, which have far-reaching implications in the age of globalization. Examples include knowledge, particularly projects deliberately created and released for public use, such as free software or the free online encyclopedia Wikipedia or more broadly, the common heritage of mankind.

== Definition ==
In traditional usage, a pure global public good is a good that has the three following properties:

- It is non-rivalrous. Consumption of this good by anyone does not reduce the quantity available to other agents.
- It is non-excludable. It is impossible to prevent anyone from consuming that good.
- It is available more-or-less worldwide.

This concept is an extension of American economist Paul Samuelson's classic notion of public goods to the economics of globalization.

The traditional theoretical concept of public goods does not distinguish with regard to the geographical region in which a good may be produced or consumed. However, the term "global public good" has been used to mean a public good which is non-rivalrous and non-excludable throughout the whole world, as opposed to a public good which exists in just one national area. Knowledge has been used as a classic example of a global public good. Besides knowledge created or published in proprietary ways, such knowledge includes the output of projects deliberately created and released for public use, such as free software or Wikipedia. In some academic literature, it has become associated with the concept of a common heritage of mankind.

== Challenges to the traditional definition ==
Significant challenges exist to the classical definition of "public goods", in general, that are also relevant to the definition of "global public goods". Kaul et al. (2003), suggest that there are actually three types of public goods. First, there are public goods that cannot be made excludable, either because they are inherently indivisible or because the cost of division would be prohibitive. A simple example would be sunlight. Second, there are goods that are inherently public by design. Examples include a nation's judiciary system or basic education system. A third type, they argue, are goods that are public by default, either due to lack of foresight or knowledge in the design. An example of this type would be the ozone layer and damage done to the environment by chlorofluorocarbon (CFC) emissions before anyone understood the potential for damage.

Many of the challenges to traditional definitions have to do with how to handle externalities, which pose fundamental economic policy problems when individuals, households, governments or firms do not include, in their total cost accounting, the indirect costs of or the benefits from their economic transactions. Private goods producers, for example, can lower their total costs, and therefore their prices, by externalizing (not including) certain costs, such as the costs of preventing air or water pollution that is a by-product of their production methods. Such a company, then, becomes a corporate free rider, driving up the cost of the "public goods" of clean air and water, which are often transnational resources.

The transnational nature of such resources points to another problem with a traditional definition of global public goods. Remedies to problems such as air and water pollution are typically legal remedies, and such laws often exist only in the context of geographically-bounded governmental systems. In the case of global public goods—such as climate change mitigation, financial stability, security, knowledge production, and global public health—either international or supranational legal entities (both public and private) must be created to manage these goods. As different types of global public goods often require different types of legal structures to manage them, this can contribute to a proliferation of non-governmental organizations (NGOs) and intergovernmental organizations (IGOs), such as has been the case in the recent past.

Thus, society can modify the non-rivalry and non-excludability of a good's benefits such that goods often become private or public as a result of deliberate policy choices. New consideration in the face of these challenges can expand the definition to recognize that, in many cases, goods exist not in their original forms but as social constructs, largely determined by policies and other collective human actions.

== Implications ==
At a time when processes of globalization are encompassing increasingly more cultural and natural resources, the ways in which global public goods are created, designed, and managed have far-reaching implications. Issues of globalization, today, are precisely those that are beyond the policy endeavors of states, reflecting a mismatch between the scope of the problem and the authority of decision-making bodies attempting to address such issues. Many goods that might be public by default would be best designated at the policy level as common goods (global-level common-pool resources or global commons), with appropriate regulation, until such time as levels of knowledge, foresight and governing structures might become available to designate such resources as either private or public goods.

Although not the only example, no better example can be found than the issue of potable water. Water has always been an important and life-sustaining drink to humans and is essential to the survival of all known organisms. Over large parts of the world, humans have inadequate access to potable water and use sources contaminated with disease vectors, pathogens or unacceptable levels of toxins or suspended solids. Drinking or using such water in food preparation leads to widespread waterborne diseases, causing acute and chronic illnesses or death and misery in many countries.

While the global water cycle is the subject of advanced scientific study and observation, it is still an incompletely understood process. If availability of water for human consumption is left solely to market forces, those who are most in need of water for subsistence-level survival are also those least likely to be able to purchase it at a market price. Since the water cycle and the natural flows of fresh water resources do not obey the limits of political boundaries, neither can these water resources be managed solely by local- or national-level public authorities. Privatization of such resources can be used as a method of avoiding contentious public policy-making processes, but is likely to produce inequities. The history of the development of water supply and sanitation in Ecuador and resulting water conflicts there are an example. Thoughtful design of transnational or international water management authorities over such global common-pool resources will play a large part in possible solutions to peak water problems.

Moreover, there are a number of global public goods—or global-level common-pool resources—that are necessary conditions for continuing global trade and transactions. Even if one takes a position that globalization has more negative impacts than positive, the economic interdependence of national-level economies has reached a kind of point of no return in terms of continued global economic stability. Thus, continuing global trade and transactions require global public goods such as widespread peace, international economic stability, functioning supranational trade authorities, stable financial and monetary systems, effective law enforcement, relatively healthy populations of consumers and laborers, etc.

== See also ==
- Public good
- Global commons
- Inge Kaul
- Digital Public Goods
