= Natural heritage =

Elements of biodiversity, including flora and fauna, ecosystems and geological structures

Natural heritage refers to the sum total of the elements of biodiversity, including flora and fauna, ecosystems, and geological structures. It forms part of the natural resources of a given region.

== Definition ==
Definitions:

- Natural heritage refers to natural features, geological and physiographical formations and delineated areas that constitute the habitat of threatened species of animals and plants and natural sites of value from the point of view of science, conservation or natural beauty.
- Heritage is that which is inherited from past generations, maintained in the present, and bestowed to future generations. The term "natural heritage", derived from "natural inheritance", pre-dates the term "biodiversity". It is a less scientific term and more easily comprehended in some ways by the wider audience interested in conservation.

The term was used in this context in the US when Jimmy Carter set up the Georgia Heritage Trust while he was governor of Georgia; Carter's trust dealt with both natural and cultural heritage. It would appear that Carter picked the term up from Lyndon Johnson, who used it in a 1966 Message to Congress. (He may have gotten the term from his wife Lady Bird Johnson who was personally interested in conservation.) President Johnson signed the Wilderness Act of 1964.

The term "Natural Heritage" was picked up by the Science Division of The Nature Conservancy (TNC) when, under Robert E. Jenkins, Jr., it launched in 1974 what ultimately became the network of state natural heritage programs—one in each state, all using the same methodology and all supported permanently by state governments because they scientifically document conservation priorities and facilitate science-based environmental reviews. When this network was extended outside the United States, the term "Conservation Data Center (or Centre)" was suggested by Guillermo Mann and came to be preferred for programs outside the US. Despite the name difference, these programs, too, use the same core methodology as the 50 state natural heritage programs. In 1994 the network of natural heritage programs formed a membership association to work together on projects of common interest: the Association for Biodiversity Information (ABI). In 1999, through an agreement with The Nature Conservancy, ABI expanded and assumed responsibility for the scientific databases, information, and tools developed by TNC in support of the network of natural heritage programs. In 2001, ABI changed its name to NatureServe. NatureServe continues to serve as the hub of the NatureServe Network, a collaboration of 86 governmental and non-governmental organizations including natural heritage programs and conservation data centers located in the United States, Canada, and Latin America.

== Legal status ==
An important site of natural heritage or cultural heritage can be listed as a World Heritage Site by the World Heritage Committee of UNESCO. The UNESCO programme, catalogues, names, and conserves sites of outstanding cultural or natural importance to the common heritage of humanity. As of July 2023, there are 257 natural World Heritage sites (including 39 mixed sites) in 111 countries. This represents a total of more than 3,500,000 km^{2} (1,400,000 sq mi) of protected areas, 60% of which are marine.

The 1972 UNESCO World Heritage Convention established that biological resources, such as plants, were the common heritage of mankind or as was expressed in the preamble: "need to be preserved as part of the world heritage of mankind as a whole". These rules probably inspired the creation of great public banks of genetic resources, located outside the source-countries.

New global agreements (e.g., the Convention on Biological Diversity), national rights over biological resources (not property). The idea of static conservation of biodiversity is disappearing and being replaced by the idea of dynamic conservation, through the notion of resource and innovation.

The new agreements commit countries to conserve biodiversity, develop resources for sustainability and share the benefits resulting from their use. Under new rules, it is expected that bioprospecting or collection of natural products has to be allowed by the biodiversity-rich country, in exchange for a share of the benefits.

In 2005, the World Heritage Marine Programme was established to protect environmental areas with Outstanding Universal Value.

== See also ==
- Geoheritage
- Paleontological heritage
