= Marisa Maria Louise Micallef =

Maltese diplomat

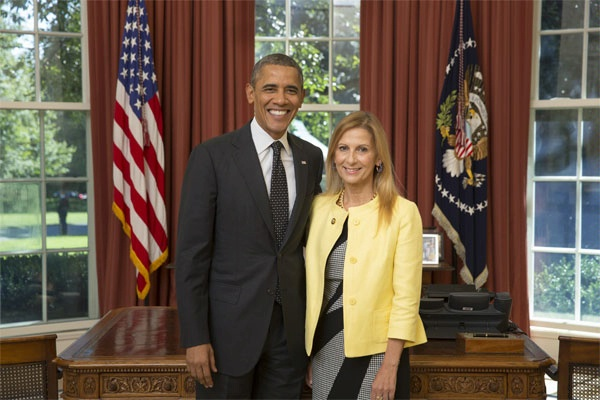
- Micallef (right) with U.S. President Barack Obama in September 2013

Ambassador of Malta to the United States
- In office July 17, 2013 – August 2015
- Preceded by: Joseph Cole

Personal details
- Party: Labour Party
- Education: University of Malta

Marisa Maria Louise Micallef is a former Maltese diplomat. She served as the Maltese Ambassador to the United States, Maltese High Commissioner to Canada, and High Commissioner to the Bahamas.

== Biography ==
Micallef attended the Convent of the Sacred Heart school in Malta before graduating from the University of Malta with a degree in French and English.

Micallef lived in the U.K. for 15 years, returning to Malta in 1998, at which point she became chairperson of Malta's housing authority, a role she served in for the next ten years. She was a frequent columnist in The Malta Independent. Previously a member of the Nationalist Party, she joined the Labour Party in 2009.

In July 2013, Micallef was appointed the Maltese Ambassador to the United States. She replaced Joseph Cole, who was ambassador for less than a year. She was the first Maltese woman to serve in the role. Micallef stepped down from the position in August 2015.

In June 2014, Micallef became Maltese High Commissioner to Canada.

In April 2015, Micallef presented her Letters of Credence as High Commissioner to the Bahamas.

== Personal life ==
Micallef has one child.

Her cousin, Mark Micallef, was Malta's ambassador to Spain.
