= Albert Borg Olivier de Puget =

Maltese diplomat

Albert Borg Olivier de Puget (born 15 April 1932 in Valletta; died 8 August 2017) was a Maltese diplomat who served as Ambassador to Paris with concurrent accreditation to Spain, Portugal and Switzerland as well as Malta's Permanent Delegate to UNESCO (1987-1990) and Washington, concurrently High Commissioner to Canada and Ambassador Designated to Mexico (1991-1997).

Borg Olivier de Puget was also a member of the Maltese Parliament from 1966 until 1981. He served as Government Chief Whip (1966-1971) and as Opposition Chief Whip (1971-1974) and from 1971 to 1981, he was Shadow Minister of Commonwealth and Foreign Affairs and Shadow Minister of Tourism. He was a member of the Nationalist Party (Malta).
