= Guido Lanfranco =

Maltese writer (1930–2021)

- Born: Sliema
- Died: 8 September 2021
- Occupation: Writer and scholar
- Language: Maltese language
- Notable awards: Medal of Merit; Midalja għall-Qadi tar-Repubblika

Guido Lanfranco, MQR (18 October 1930 – 8 September 2021) was a Maltese writer on natural history and folklore.

== Early life and education ==
Lanfranco was born in Sliema, Malta, on 18 October 1930. He was educated at Stella Maris College and St. Michaels College of Education. He pursued other courses at the University of Malta and Dale Field Studies Centre in Wales.

== Career ==
Lanfranco was a teacher in various schools and a member of many educational boards and committees as well as local and foreign scientific societies. He was the first president of the Natural History Society of Malta, the Din L-Art Ħelwa and various other societies, and president of the Malta Folklore Society.

== Awards and honours ==
He was awarded the Bronze Medal of Merit by the Conference of Civic Councils in 1969, and the Midalja għall-Qadi tar-Repubblika (M.Q.R.) in 1996.

In 2004 Lanfranco won the annual Literary Prize on Folklore awarded by the Maltese National Book Council.

== Other achievements ==
Lanfranco organized various exhibitions, mostly on flora, fauna, geology, science and folklore. Many of his publications and articles, illustrated by himself, were published in local and foreign papers, magazines and journals. He also wrote and lectured on Maltese history. He organized many exhibitions and gave numerous lectures on natural history, archeology, and geology.

== Publications ==
- Guide to the Flora of Malta (1955, 1969),
- A Guide to the Fishes of Malta (1958, 1965, 1974),
- Duwa u Semm fil-Ħxejjex Maltin (1975),
- Lampuki u Ħut: Ġabra ta’ riċetti u informazzjoni (1989)
- Ħxejjex Mediċinali u Oħrajn fil-Gżejjer Maltin (1993, 2000).

== Family ==
Lanfranco was married to Salvina Bonnici; they had two children, Sandro and Graziella.

== Death ==
Lanfranco died on 8 September 2021, at the age of 90.

== Sources ==
The Times of Malta, 21 September 1968, page 2
