= Joseph E. Debono =

Maltese physician (1903–1974)

Professor Joseph E. Debono (b. 1903 d. 1974), a Maltese consultant physician, was appointed Demonstrator of Medicine in 1928, Professor of Materia Medica and Pharmacology in 1963 and Professor of Medicine in 1964.

== Personal history ==
Joseph Edward Debono was born on 1 May 1903 in Valletta. He was educated at the Royal University of Malta, graduating with a Bachelor of Science in 1921 and a Medical Doctorate in 1925. He then continued on to post-graduate studies, attaining his MRCS LRCP in 1926 and his MRCP in 1935.

== Career ==
Debono was a Professor of Medicine at the University of Malta from 1946 to 1963.

Professor Debono carried out original work on vaccination of goats, together with Sir Temistocles (Temi) Zammit, wrote many papers on Undulant Fever (also known as the Malta Fever) and introduced Aureomycin, which was followed by other antibiotics, in 1949. He was the first to popularize the concept of dehydration in Infantile Diarrhorea and introduced the simple but efficient treatment which greatly reduced mortality.

Professor Debono was appointed consultant physician to the Lazaretto Isolation Hospital in 1942 (during the worst part of the Second World War), and was in charge of the polio patients until the post war epidemic was over. In 1963 he started an independent diabetic clinic and had continued for many years to serve as its director.

== Work in the diabetes field ==
In his article, What every diabetic should know, Debono described a maintenance diet for diabetics that consisted of a low-calorie menu that would, if necessary, be supplemented through insulin injections.

== Work in the area of brucellosis (Goat Fever or Malta Fever) ==
Professor Debono spent much time studying the brucella melitensis strain of brucellosis. In 1939 Debono assisted with the publication of a book on the subject, Brucellosis in man and animals.

== Awards ==
Professor Debono was awarded a Civil Division CBE ("Commander of the Order of the British Empire") in the British New Year's Honours List of 1956 for medical services in Malta.

In 1968 Professor Debono was chosen by the Confederation of Civic Councils (Malta) and awarded the first Gold Medal of Merit on behalf of the Maltese Nation. The Medal of Merit was awarded to those who had shown special merit or had given exception service to Malta.

== Publications ==
- Brucellosis in man and animals 1939, The Commonwealth Fund, revised 1947.
- What every diabetic should know 1927, Malta.
- The Treatment of Diarrhoea in Infancy Criterion Press, 1944 - From paper read on 17 August 1943.
- Kala-Azar in Infancy 1947 - From paper read on 25 October 1946.
