= Joseph Attard Kingswell =

Maltese diplomat (1925–2002)

Joseph Attard Kingswell (1925–2002) was a Maltese trade unionist and diplomat. He served as General Secretary to the General Workers Union, the largest trade union in Malta; as well as being the Ambassador for Malta in Belgium and the Ambassador Extraordinary in Norway. He was also the editor of It-Torċa, a newspaper issued by the union, from 1958 to 1967. He travelled abroad on international assignments by the International Confederation of Free Trade Unions from 1959.

== Biography ==
Born on 25 July 1925, Attard Kingswell was a delegate for the workers at International Labour Conferences since 1955. He had acted as industrial adviser to the Government of Malta and to the Malta Labour Party in Malta and in London and was a member of several government boards and committees. He was a member of the Duke of Edinburgh Commonwealth Conference in Canada in 1960. Attard Kingswell was a member of the Anglo-Maltese Joint Mission in 1967 and member of the Steering Committee. In 1968 Attard Kingswell was chosen by the Confederation of Civic Councils (Malta) and awarded a Silver Medal of Merit on behalf of the Maltese Nation. The Medal of Merit was awarded to those who had shown special merit or had given exception service to Malta. In 1992 Attard Kingswell was made Member of the National Order of Merit which carries the denomination of UOM.

During the turbulent 1960s and 1970s, and due to political machinations, Attard Kingswell had been removed from the General Workers Union on the pretext that he had helped the government of the day finalize a deal with the British government regarding the redundancies and compensation of workers employed with the UK Services on the rundown of the military bases in Malta. Another clash had been his opposition to the unification of the union with the Malta Labour Party, as Attard Kingswell felt that such a union was not in the interest of the workers.

Between 1987 and 1996 he served as advisor to Prime Minister Eddie Fenech Adami, with special responsibilities for Malta Drydocks and Marsa Shipbuilding.

== Death ==
Attard Kingswell died on 21 January 2002 at the age of 76 years.

== Sources ==
- The Times of Malta, 21 September 1968
