= Thomas Sterner =

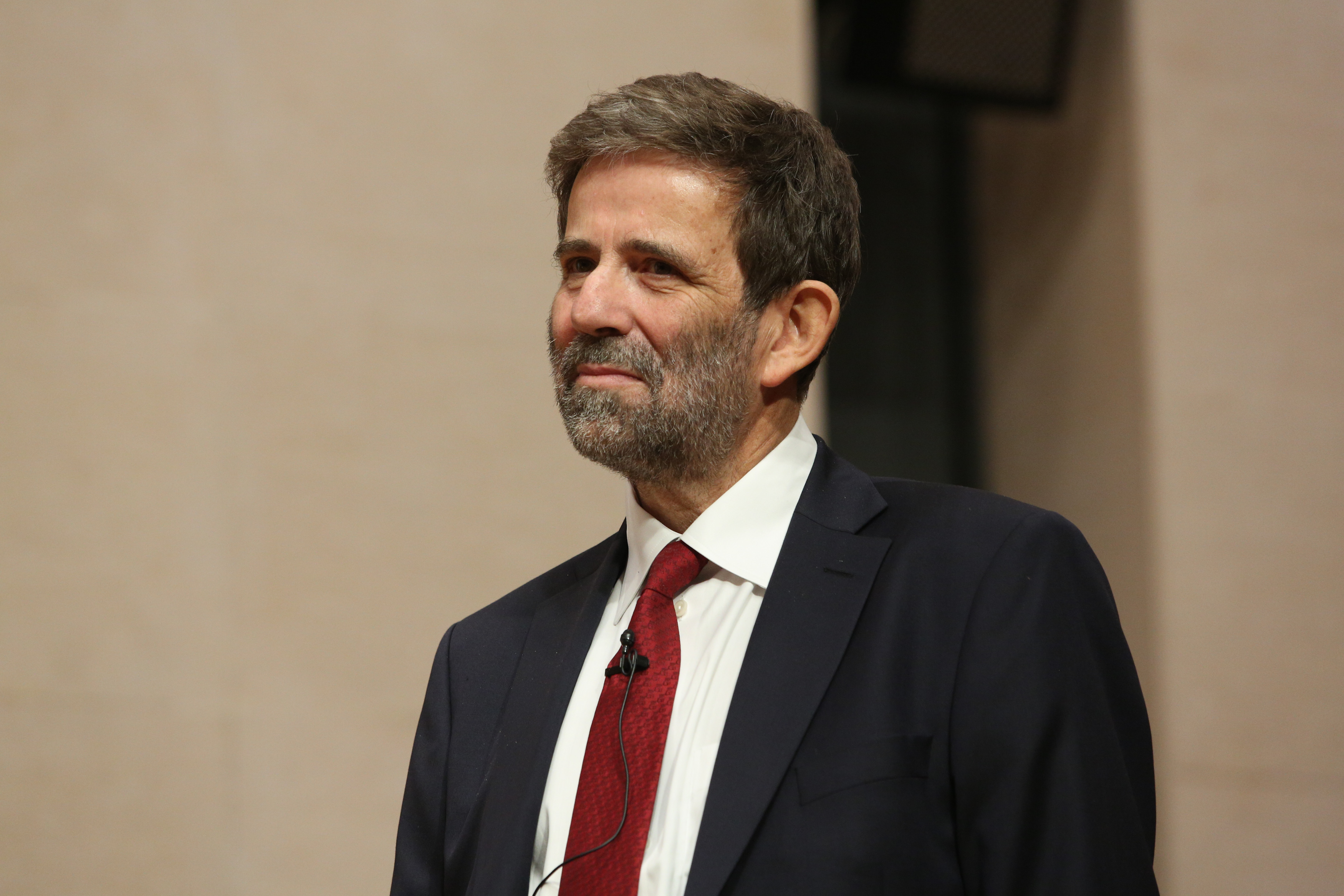
- Born: Thomas Nils Samuel Sterner; 22 March 1952 (age 74); Gothenburg, Sweden
- Occupation: Professor at University of Gothenburg

Thomas Nils Samuel Sterner (born 22 March 1952) is a Swedish economist and a professor of environmental economics at the University of Gothenburg in Sweden. His research and publications are mostly focused on the design of policy instruments which address environmental problems. Sterner has published more than 125 articles in refereed journals. He has a Google scholar h-index of 50 (2021). He authored or edited more than a dozen books and a large number of book chapters, official reports and journalistic articles regarding environmental policy instruments. These publications include applications to energy, climate, industry, transport economics and resource management in developing countries.

His main research interests are on discounting and on instrument design for climate and environmental policy. On the latter area, applications range from general climate topics to more specific issues such as carbon pricing, fuel taxes, carbon capture, policies in developing countries, management of fisheries, buildings, transport, chemicals, plastics, antibiotics, biodiversity. Hence, anything related to the circular economy, sustainability or economics of the Anthropocene.

== Education ==
Sterner began his education in London at Hamilton House Prep School between 1958 and 1965. He continued his secondary education, also in London, at the Westminster Public School between 1965 and 1969. He received his BA degree from the University of Gothenburg in 1976 and his Ph.D. from the same institution in 1986. Additionally, he held visiting researcher positions at respected higher education and research institutions such as the University of Grenoble in France, the University of Cambridge in England, Universidad de la Republica in Uruguay, El Colegio de México, Universidad Nacional Autónoma de México.

He speaks Swedish, English, French, Spanish, German and possesses beginner's efforts in Italian and Swahili.

== Career ==
Thomas Sterner is the Head of the Environmental Economics Unit and one of the founders of the Environment for Development Initiative in Gothenburg. He was elected as a visiting professor at the Collège de France in 2015–2016. He has been a guest researcher at, among others, the University of Grenoble, the University of Cambridge, Universidad de la Republica in Uruguay, El Colegio de México and Universidad Nacional Autónoma de México. He is a part of several boards, including several of the large environmental economics research groups in Europe: Mercator Research Institute in Potsdam, Chaire Economie du Climat at the University Paris Dauphine, and Climate Econometrics at Oxford, as well as the Council on French Sovereign Green bonds, French Government.

Currently, he continues his teaching and research in Gothenburg, Sweden. More specifically, he teaches the master's course Environmental Policy Instruments at the Chalmers University of Technology.

== Honours and awards ==
In 2014, Sterner was awarded Environmental Fiscal Reformer of the Year by Green Budget Europe. He holds honorary positions at renowned institutions, most notably Honorary Doctor in Dublin, Honorary Professor, University of Cape Town, Fellow, Resources for the Future, Royal Society of Arts and Sciences in Gothenburg, and the Beijer Institute of the Swedish Royal Academy of Sciences. He is also the former president of the European Association of Environmental and Resource Economists. In 2020 he was appointed knight (chevalier) in the French legion of honor by President Macron.

== Books and publications ==
Thomas Sterner has contributed to these books:

- The Economics of Environmental Policy – Behavioral and Political Dimensions (2016)
- National and Sub-national Policies and Institutions (2014)
- Environmental Regulation and Public Disclosure, The Case of PROPER in Indonesia (2013)
- Policy Instruments for Environmental and Natural Resource Management (2012)
- Fuel Taxes and the Poor, The Distributional Effects of Gasoline Taxation and Their Implications for Climate Policy (2011) *Environmental Taxation in Practice (2006)
- Choosing Environmental Policy, Comparing Instruments and Outcomes in the United States and Europe (2004)
- Policy Instruments for Environmental and Natural Resource Management (2003)

Thomas Sterner has authored or co-authored the following selection of publications:

- Hagem, C., Hoel, M., & Sterner, T. (2020). Refunding Emission Payments: Output-Based versus Expenditure-Based Refunding. Environmental and Resource Economics, 1-27. DOI: https://doi.org/10.1007/s10640-020-00513-1
- Damania, R., Sterner, T. & Whittington, D. (2020). Environmental policy instruments and corruption. China Economic Journal, doi:10.1080/17538963.2020.1751454
- Hänsel, M., Drupp, M. A., Johansson, D. J. A., Nesje, F., Azar, C., Freeman, M. C., Groom, B. & Sterner, T. (2020) Climate economics support for the UN climate targets. Nature Climate Change. DOI: https://doi.org/10.1038/s41558-020-0833-x
- Sterner, T., Carson, R., Hafstead, M., Howard, P., Carlsson Jagers, S., Köhlin, G., Parry, I., Rafaty, R., Somanatan, E., Steckel, J. C., Whittington, D., Alpizar, F., Ambec, S., Aravena, C., Bonilla, J., Daniels, R. C., Garcia, J., Harring, N., Kacker, K., Kerr, S., Medhin, H., Khanh Nam, P., Romero, G., Johansson Stenman, O., Toman, M., Xu, J. & Wang, M. (2020). Funding Inclusive Green Transition through Greenhouse Gas Pricing. ifo DICE Report, 18(1), 03–08.
- Sterner, T., Barbier, E.B., Bateman, I., van den Bijgaart, I., Crépin, A.S., Edenhofer, O., Fischer, C., Habla, W., Hassler, J., Johansson-Stenman, O., Lange, A., Polasky S., Rockström, J., Smith, H.G., Steffen, W., Wagner G., Wilen. J.E., Alpízar, F., Azar C., Carless, D., Chávez, C., Coria, J., Engström, G., Jagers, S.C., Köhlin, G., Löfgren, Å., Pleijel, H. and Robinson, A. (2019). Policy design for the Anthropocene. Nature Sustainability, 2(1), 14-21 Jan 10th. DOI: https://doi.org/10.1038/s41893-018-0194-x
- Meckling, J., Sterner, T., and Wagner, G. (2017). Policy sequencing toward decarbonization. Nature Energy, 2(12), p. 918. DOI: https://doi.org/10.1038/s41560-017-0025-8
- Johansson-Stenman, O. and Sterner, T. (2015). Discounting and Relative Consumption. Journal of Environmental Economics and Management. 71 (May 2015): 19-33 DOI: https://doi.org/10.1016/j.jeem.2015.01.006
