= Salvino Busuttil =

Maltese economist and philosopher (1936–2016)

- Born: 1936; Floriana, Malta
- Died: 12 May 2016 (aged 79)
- Occupation: Philosopher

Salvino Busuttil (1936 – 12 May 2016) was a Maltese economist, philosopher and diplomat who served as ambassador to France. In philosophy he specialised in economics and international relations.

== Life and career ==
Busuttil was born at Floriana, Malta in 1936.

He studied philosophy at the Gregorian University in Rome, Italy from which he acquired a licentiate in 1959. He acquired a Doctorate in Philosophy from the Angelicum University in Rome in 1961 with a dissertation entitled Value in Karl Marx . In 1963 he earned a Doctorate in Economy from the University of Manchester. After returning to Malta Busuttil was appointed Professor and Head of the Department of Economics at the University of Malta in 1964, an office he held up till 1975. Two years later, in 1966, he was chosen as Head of the Faculty of Arts until 1972.

From 1987 till 1996 Busuttil was General Director of the Foundation of International Studies at the University of Malta. Both on a local as well as on an international level he occupied various positions of responsibility related to the economy and the environment, especially with UNESCO.

Busuttil died on 12 May 2016, at the age of 79.

== Works ==
Busuttil published various works. Some of them, like those dealing with purely economic matters, are not of direct interest to philosophy. Others, however, contain significant philosophical value. Amongst these one can find the following:

- 1963 - Value in Marx.
- 1969 - Philosophical and Economical Foundations of the Marxian Theory of Value.
- 1990 – A Note on Economic Responsibility Towards Future Generations (in Our Responsibilities Towards Future Generations).
- 1994 – Protecting Our Common Future (in What Future for Future Generations?).
- 1994 – Foreword (in The Search for Peace in the Mediterranean Region).
- 1994 – The Role of Universities in the Quest for Peace in the Mediterranean (in The Search for Peace in the Mediterranean Region).
- 1998 – Preface (in Future Generations and International Law).

Busuttil coedited a number of book of philosophical interest, namely:

- 1990 - Our Responsibilities Towards Future Generations (with Emmanuel Agius, Peter Serracino Inglott, and Tony Macelli).
- 1991 - Directions in the Study of Peace Education (with James Calleja, and Helena Kekkonen).
- 1994 - What Future for Future Generations? (with Emmanuel Agius).
- 1996 - Interfaces (with Joe Friggieri).
- 1998 - Future Generations & International Law (with Emmanuel Agius).
- 1998 - Germ-Line Intervention and our Responsibilities to Future Generations (with Emmanuel Agius).

== See also ==
- Philosophy in Malta
