= Pierre Clive Agius =

Ambassador of Malta

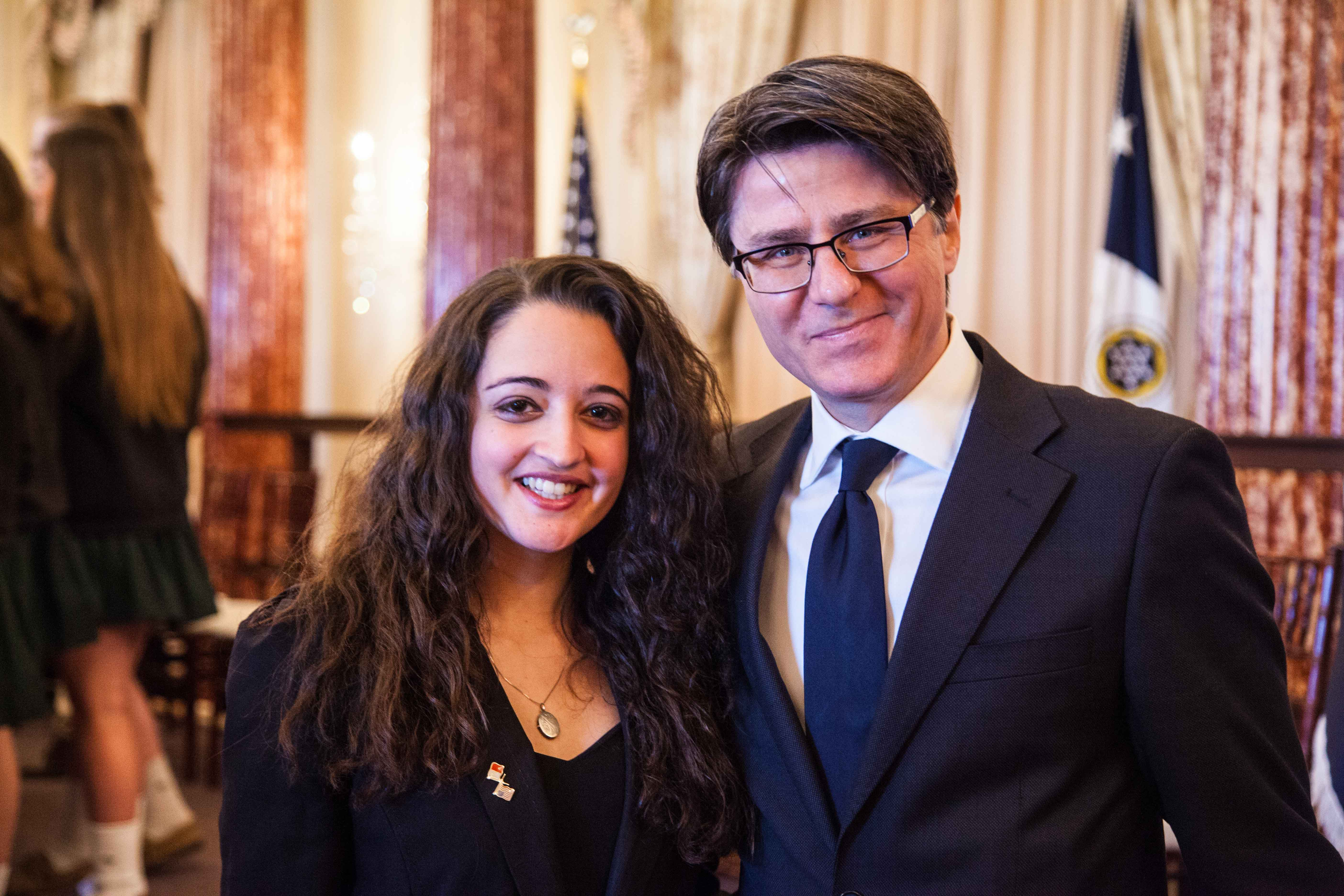
Ambassador Pierre Clive Agius with Maltese student in the US in 2016.

Pierre Clive Agius (born 21 October 1965) is a Maltese diplomat who has served as Ambassador of Malta to France since January 2024. He has previously held ambassadorial posts in Belgium, Luxembourg, NATO, France, Monaco, Poland, Moldova, Armenia, the United States and Russia.

He is regarded as one of Malta's most senior career diplomats, with postings in Europe, the United States and Russia spanning more than two decades.

== Early life and education ==
Agius was born in Malta, on 21 October 1965, to Joseph Agius and Josephine (née Zammit). He attended the Archbishop's Minor Seminary before enrolling at the University of Malta, where he obtained a Bachelor of Education (Honours) in 1992.

In 1994, he earned a Post-Graduate Diploma in Environmental Management, and in 1995 he completed a Master's in Diplomatic Studies at the Mediterranean Academy of Diplomatic Studies.His master's dissertation was entitled "In Search of Peace and Security in Europe - the OSCE".

Before entering the diplomatic service, he worked as a teacher of Italian.

== Early Diplomatic Career ==
Agius joined the Ministry of Foreign Affairs of Malta in 1993 as a First Secretary.

His first overseas posting came in 1995, when he was assigned to the Embassy of Malta in Paris. In 1999, he was transferred to Geneva, serving as Malta's Permanent Mission to the United Nations and as Consul General for Swiss cantons

In 2000, he was promoted to Counsellor.

In 2002, Agius returned to Malta to serve as Diplomatic Counsellor to the President of Malta, Guido de Marco.

In 2004, he was posted to Vienna as Deputy Head of Mission at Malta's Permanent Mission to the Organization for Security and Cooperation in Europe (OSCE), the United Nations Office in Vienna, and the International Atomic Energy Agency (IAEA).

== Ambassadorial career ==
=== Special Envoy to Slovenia (2007) ===
In 2007, Pierre Clive Agius was appointed special envoy to EU Presidency of Slovenia.

=== Belgium, Luxembourg and NATO (2008–2012) ===
In December 2008, Agius was appointed Ambassador of Malta to Belgium, and in March 2009, he was also accredited as Ambassador to Luxembourg. During the same period, he served as Malta's Ambassador to NATO.

=== France and Monaco (2012–2013) ===
In March 2012, he was appointed Ambassador to France and the Principality of Monaco.

=== Poland, Moldova, Belarus,Georgia and Armenia (2013–2016) ===
In October 2013, he was appointed Ambassador of Malta to the Republic of to Poland, Belarus, Georgia, Moldova, and Armenia.

=== United States and Canada (2016–2019) ===
In 2016 he was appointed Ambassador of Malta to the United States and presented his credentials to President Obama on 2 March 2016. He also covered as High Commissioner of Malta to Canada from Washington DC, when he presented his credentials to Right Honorable David Johnston on 6 December 2016.

His posting to Washington marked his first assignment outside Europe. During his tenure, he actively promoted Malta-US relations, Malta's role within the EU, and cultural and historical links between Malta and the US.

Years after his posting in DC, he is still regarded very highly by his counterparts in the US.

=== Russian Federation (2018–2022) ===
In 2018, Agius became Ambassador of Malta to the Russian Federation. During his tenure, he engaged in diplomatic outreach during the COVID-19 pandemic and the following Russian war of aggression against Ukraine.

Among other achievements, in 2021, Agius publicly described isolation caused by travel restrictions, stating that he had been unable to visit his family for two years due to regional pandemic controls.

In 2022, he issued a widely cited tribute to Mikhail Gorbachev, praising his role in ending the Cold War and his historic link to Malta through the 1989 Malta Summit.

=== Return to France (2024-Present) ===
In January 2024, Agius returned to Paris as he was reappointed Ambassador of Malta to France. Among other prominent successes, Ambassador Agius continues to represent Malta in cultural and academic diplomacy, including Franco-Maltese cooperation and academic exchanges.

== Diplomatic Achievements ==
In 2013, while serving in Paris, Agius became the first Maltese ambassador to revive the flame at the Tomb of the Unknown Soldier under the Arc de Triomphe, a ceremony symbolising Franco-Maltese relations.

He has also been active in academic diplomacy, including cooperation between various universities including the MGIMO University in Moscow and the University of Malta, and has participated in Euro-Mediterranean energy and cultural initiatives.

Since 2024, Pierre Clive Agius has also been an editor for Parisio, a yearly foreign affairs publication issued by the Maltese Ministry of Foreign Affairs.

== Langages ==
Agius speaks Maltese, English, Italian and French, and has working knowledge of Slovene and Arabic.

== Personal life ==
Pierre Clive Agius is married to Irena Jager Agius and has two daughters - Katarina and Rebecca Agius Jager.

He has described himself as highly structured and disciplined, maintaining strict personal routines. His interests include cycling, theatre and music, particularly classical music and jazz.

== Honours ==
In January 2004, Agius was awarded the Ufficiale dell'Ordine al Merito della Repubblica Italiana by the President of Italy.

== Legacy ==
Pierre Clive Agius is regarded as one of Malta's most experienced career diplomats, having represented the country at the highest level in Europe, Russia and the United States. His career has spanned more than three decades, during which he has served in nearly every major diplomatic theatre relevant to Maltese foreign policy.
