= Michael Zürn =

German political scientist

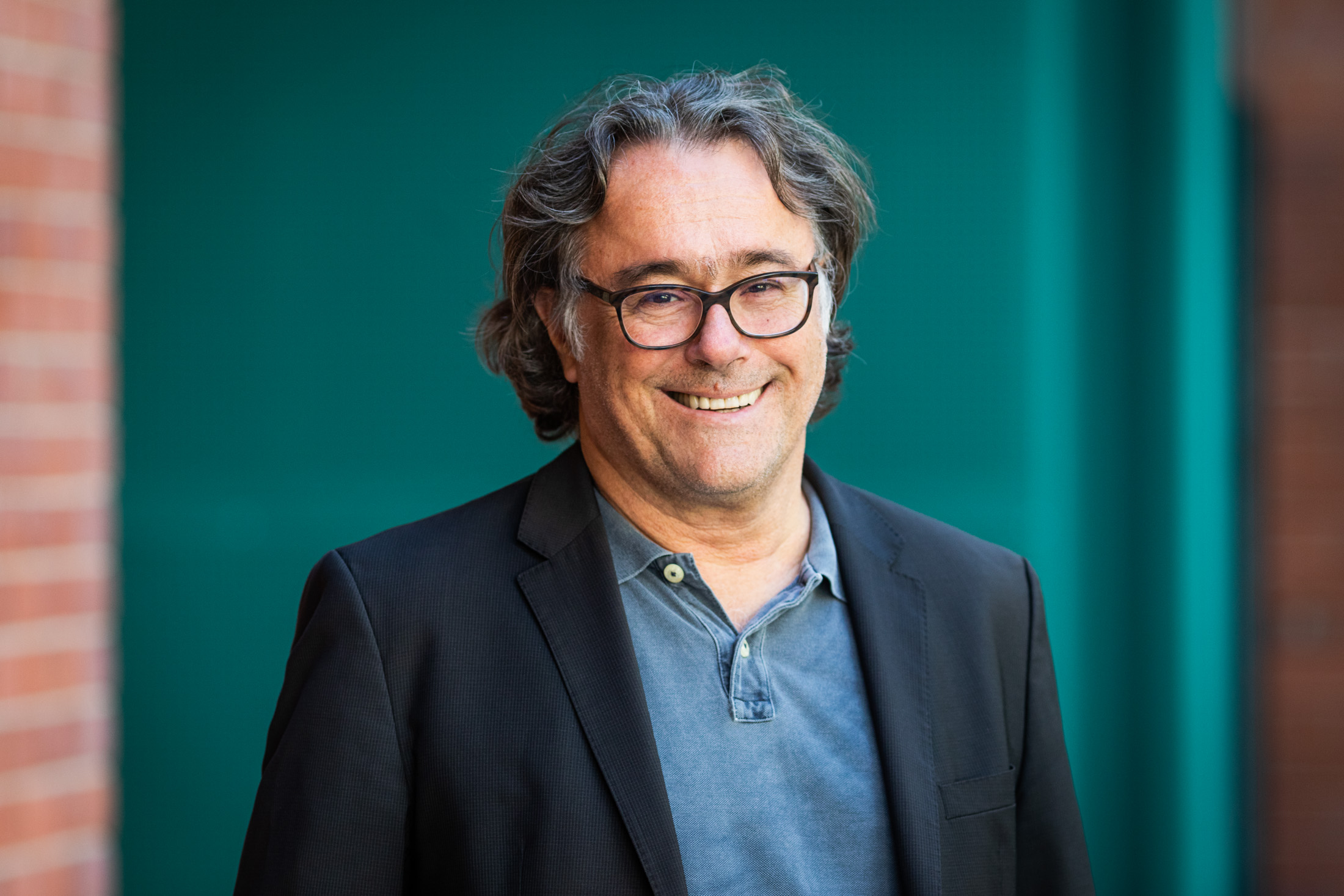
- Born: 14 February 1959; Esslingen am Neckar, Germany

Michael Zürn (born February 14, 1959 in Esslingen am Neckar) is a German political scientist. He has been Director of the Global Governance research department at the WZB Berlin Social Science Center and Professor of International Relations at Freie Universität Berlin since 2004. According to an analysis of political science publications in 2017, he was referred to as the “center of the German political science universe”.

== Biography ==
Zürn received his master’s degree in International Relations from the University of Denver in 1984. In 1987, he completed his first state examination in Political Science and German Studies at the University of Tübingen. In the same year, he participated in the Essex Summer School in Social Science, Data Analysis, and Collection. He completed his doctorate at the University of Tübingen in 1991, focusing on game theory, functionalism and international politics.

From 1989 to 1991, Zürn was a doctoral and postdoctoral researcher in the University of Tübingen and a visiting professor at the University of Denver. From 1993, he held various positions at the University of Bremen, including Director of Institute of Intercultural and International Studies (1995–2004), the Centre of European Law and Politics (1997–2000), and the Institute for Political Science (2001–2003). He also co-founded the Berlin Graduate School of Social Sciences at the Humboldt University of Berlin and led the Collaborative Research Center 597 “Transformations of the State”. In 2004, he moved to Berlin to join the WZB and Freie Universität Berlin and served as Founding Director and Rector of the Hertie School of Governance until 2009. He is the Founding Dean and First Honorary Fellow of the Hertie School.

In 2008, Zürn co-founded the Berlin Graduate School for Transnational Studies (BTS) at Freie Universität Berlin, where he later served as Director (2015–2018) and is now a board member. He was spokesperson for the DFG research group “Overlapping Spheres of Authority and Interface Conflicts in the Global Order” (2016–2018) and co-spokesperson for the DFG-funded Cluster of Excellence “Contestations of the Liberal Script” (SCRIPTS) from 2019 to 2024. He also directs the Knowledge Exchange Lab within SCRIPTS.

Zürn has served on the presidium of the German Evangelical Church Assembly, the senate of the DFG, and the board of the Development and Peace Foundation. He has also reviewed for the European Research Council and chaired the scientific advisory boards of the Käte Hamburger Kolleg/Centre for Global Cooperation Research and the Cluster of Excellence “Normative Orders” at Goethe University Frankfurt. He is a member of the General Assembly of the Heinrich Böll Foundation and an editor of Leviathan – Berlin Journal of Social Sciences, as well as a member of several editorial boards.

Zürn is a member of the Berlin-Brandenburg Academy of Sciences and Humanities since 2007, a board member thereof since 2013, and a member of Academia Europaea since 2014.

In 2021, Zürn was awarded the Berliner Wissenschaftspreis from the then Mayor of Berlin, Michael Müller. He was also a fellow at the Thomas Mann House in Los Angeles in the same year.

== Research Interests ==
Zürn’s academic work can be broadly organized into four topic areas:

First, his early work on regime theory, later developed into governance analysis, helped bring social science institutionalism into international relations. He also advanced actor-centered institutionalism and, through his situational-structural approach, developed a theory of action shaped by recognition and the ideational foundations of world politics.

Second, Zürn was influential in introducing normative concepts into the empirical study of international relations, especially through his work on democracy and the rule of law in world politics. This also contributed to the field of International Political Theory.

Third, his more recent research focuses on politicization and legitimacy struggles in international organizations and their effects on national politics. His concept of politicization has opened up an important research area, especially in light of crises in European and international institutions. This includes work on the conflict between cosmopolitanism and communitarianism.

Fourth, Zürn has examined the relationship between international relations and law, particularly how legal norms differ from other social norms and whether law can generate legitimacy.

== Publications ==
Zürn has published more than 300 articles in his field’s leading academic journals. His most notable publications include:

- Schäfer, Armin; Zürn, Michael (2021). Die demokratische Regression [The Democratic Regression] (in German). Translated by Curtis, Stephen. Berlin: Suhrkamp Verlag AG. ISBN 978-3-518-12749-0.
- Zürn, Michael (2018). A Theory of Global Governance. Authority, Legitimacy, & Contestation. Vol. 1. Oxford. doi:10.1093/oso/9780198819974.001.0001. ISBN 978-0-19-881997-4. Chinese translation: Zürn, Michael (2024). Quanqiuzhili lilun. Quanwei, hefaxing yu lunzheng. Beijing: Social Sciences Literature Press, 348 pages.
- Zürn, Michael (2000) "Democratic Governance Beyond the Nation State", in: European Journal of International Relations, 6:2, 2000, 183–221. doi: 10.1177/1354066100006002002.
- Zürn, Michael (1998). Regieren jenseits des Nationalstaates. Globalisierung und Denationalisierung als Chance. Frankfurt am Main: Suhrkamp, 395 pages.
- Levy, Marc A.; Young, Oran R.; Zürn, Michael (1995) "The Study of International Regimes", in: European Journal of International Relations, 1:3, 1995, 267–330. doi: 10.1177/1354066195001003001.
