= Global Studies Consortium =

International academic association

The Global Studies Consortium (GSC) is an international academic association of over 20 institutions of higher learning. It seeks to "promote and facilitate graduate teaching programs in global studies and to foster cooperation among them." That cooperation includes exchange of materials and development of methods to survey outcomes, annual meetings, and a student exchange program. GSC deals only with graduate level programs, and there is no comparable association for undergraduate degree programs in global studies.

The GSC was founded at a meeting of representatives of university global studies programs held in February 2007 at the Orfalea Center for Global and International Studies of the University of California at Santa Barbara. It has been influential in defining the new field of global studies.

GSC is linked to global-e: A Global Studies Journal.

== Members ==
The member programs of the GSC are listed by continent below:

=== Africa ===
- The American University in Cairo (Egypt), School of Global Affairs and Public Policy

=== Asia ===
- Hanyang University (South Korea), Research Institute of Comparative History and Culture; Graduate Program in Transnational Humanities
- Hitotsubashi University (Japan), Institute for the Study of Global Issues
- Shanghai University (China), Center for Global Studies
- Shantou University (China), Center for Global Studies
- Sophia University (Japan), Graduate Program in Global Studies

=== Australia ===
- RMIT University (Australia), School of Global Studies, Social Science and Planning
- Australian National University (Australia), Master of Globalisation

=== Europe ===
- Aarhus University (Denmark), MA in International Studies
- Berlin Graduate School for Transnational Studies (Germany) (information)
  - Free University of Berlin
  - Hertie School of Governance
  - Social Science Research Center Berlin
- European Master (which is also part of the Erasmus Mundus program)
  - University of Leipzig (Germany), Global and European Studies Institute (co-ordinating institution)
  - London School of Economics and Political Science (United Kingdom), Economic History Department
  - Roskilde University (Denmark), Department of Society & Globalization
  - University of Vienna (Austria), Department of History
  - University of Wroclaw (Poland), Institute of International Studies
- Ghent University (Belgium), Ghent Centre for Global Studies
- Lomonosov Moscow State University (Russia), Faculty of Global Processes
- University of Graz (Austria), Master's program in Global Studies

=== North America ===
- Arizona State University (US), School of Global Studies
- Rutgers University-Newark (US), Division of Global Affairs
- The New School (US), International Affairs and Global Perspectives
- University of California at Santa Barbara (US), Global & International Studies Program
- University of Illinois at Urbana-Champaign (US), Center for Global Studies
- University of Minnesota (US), Institute for Global Studies
- University of North Carolina at Chapel Hill (US), Curriculum in International and Area Studies
- University of Pittsburgh (US), World History Center / Global Studies Center
- Wilfrid Laurier University (Canada), Global Studies

== Student exchange program ==
In 2014, GSC started an exchange program called Student Mobility Scheme. As of 2016, four of the member institutions participate: American University in Cairo; Lomonosov Moscow State University; Shanghai University; and Sophia University.

== Meetings ==
The GSC has held meetings every year following the 2007 workshop at UCSB where it was founded:

1. Tokyo, hosted by Sophia University, 17–18 May 2008. (At this meeting participants identified 5 main characteristics of global studies.)
2. Leipzig, hosted by University of Leipzig, 17–18 October 2009
3. Santa Barbara, hosted by University of California - Santa Barbara, 24–25 April 2010
4. Shanghai, Hosted by Shanghai University, 17–18 June 2011 (This meeting was preceded by the China Forum on Global Studies.)
5. Melbourne, hosted by RMIT University, Melbourne, 14–17 June 2012
6. Moscow, hosted by Moscow State University, 20–23 June 2013
7. Roskilde, hosted by Roskilde University, 18–22 June 2014
8. Cairo, hosted by the School of Global Affairs at the American University in Cairo, 4–8 June 2015
9. Pittsburgh, hosted by the Global Studies Center and World History Center of the University of Pittsburgh, June 2016
