= Woll (surname) =

Woll is a Germanic surname.

== People ==
- Adrián Woll (1795–1875), Mexican general
- Balthasar Woll, (1922–1996), German Oberscharführer in the Waffen SS
- Bencie Woll (born 1950), American-British linguist and sign language scholar
- Bjørn Woll (1927–1996), Norwegian violinist, conductor, and composer
- Bobby Woll (1911–1999), American football, basketball, and baseball coach
- Carsten Woll (1885–1962), Norwegian-American singer and recording artist
- Cornelia Woll, German–French political economist
- Deborah Ann Woll (born 1985), American actress and Dungeon Master
- Ed Woll (1914–2010), American engineer who developed the first modern gas turbine engines for General Electric
- Erna Woll (1917–2005), German composer, church musician and author
- Ernst Wöll (1907–?), Austrian sports shooter
- Felicitas Woll (born 1980), German actress best known for the ARD-Series Berlin, Berlin
- Joseph Woll (born 1998), American ice hockey player
- Matthew Woll (1880–1956), Luxembourgish-American photo engraver and labor advocate
- Samantha Woll (1983–2023), American Jewish community leader

== Places ==
- Woll House in Kalispell, Montana
