= Elena Bascone =

Italian political economist (born 1995)

- Born: 1995 (age 30–31); Venice, Italy

Academic background
- Education: University of Padova; Hertie School

Academic work
- Discipline: International sanctions, European technological competitiveness
- Institutions: Graduate Institute of International and Development Studies; CEPS
- Awards: Charlemagne Prize Fellow (2023–2024)

Elena Bascone (born 1995) is an Italian author and political economist specializing in international sanctions and European technological competitiveness. She is Charlemagne Prize Fellow (2023–2024) conducting research on the development of European industry consortiums in emerging sectors such as the metaverse, space, and aviation.

== Early life and education ==
Bascone is originally from Venice and pursued bachelor's degree focusing in international relations and human rights from the University of Padova. In 2025, Bascone participated in the centenary celebrations of the Faculty of Political Science at the University of Padova alongside notable Italian political and academic figures including Lorenzo Fontana, Renato Brunetta and Daniele Franco.

She later completed a Master of International Affairs at the Hertie School in Berlin, during the presidency of Henrik Enderlein. Bascone graduated remotely in 2020 amid the COVID-19 pandemic, returning to Northern Italy on repatriation flights organized by then Foreign Minister Luigi Di Maio.

== Career and research ==
Her master's thesis developed a model on the effectiveness of international sanctions with a case study on Russia's re-entry into the Council of Europe. She has also been involved with the Graduate Institute of International and Development Studies (IHEID) in Geneva, which hosts the Geneva International Sanctions Network (GISN).

Bascone was awarded the Charlemagne Prize Fellowship for 2023–2024, where she is mentored by Wolfgang Ischinger who followed her at the Hertie School. The title of her project is "How can we make the global race to the metaverse European-like? Developing a business and policy model to build European industry consortiums" and she has been a Visiting Fellow at CEPS during her research year.

== Italian dream ==
In November 2025 it is announced her literary debut with Oscar Mondadori: "Italian dream". The book genre is described as a mix between Bildungsroman, love story and cultural critique and welcomed by intellectuals as an "hymn to resilience and hope".

== Other interests ==
Bascone has expressed a strong interest in mathematics, statistics, and programming, according to her Hertie School and Charlemagne profiles.
