= BGSS =

BGSS may refer to:

- Bedok Green Secondary School, a secondary school in Bedok, Singapore
- Sisimiut Airport, Greenland, ICAO airport code
- The Big Gay Sketch Show, an LGBT-themed sketch comedy TV show from the United States
- Berlin Graduate School of Social Sciences, a part of the Humboldt University of Berlin
