= Enderlein =

Enderlein is a surname. Notable people with the surname include:

- Günther Enderlein (1872–1968), German entomologist
- Henrik Enderlein (1974–2021), German economist and political scientist
- Matthes Enderlein vom Burgstadl (1493–1556), German-Bohemian mining master
- Ortrun Enderlein (born 1943), German luger
