= Peter Murphy Lewis =

American TV and podcast host

- Born: July 26, 1980 (age 46); Overland Park, Kansas
- Occupations: Television and podcast host
- Known for: Host of Aquí te las traigo Peter
- Website: petermurphylewis.com

Peter Murphy Lewis (born 26 July 1980) is an American television and podcast host known for hosting Aquí te las traigo Peter, a television show focused on Chilean culture and society.

== Early life and education ==
Lewis was born in Overland Park, Kansas, and grew up in Osawatomie, Kansas. In 2004, he entered the master’s program in international politics at the University of Chile. He later pursued a Ph.D. in political science at the Pontifical Catholic University of Chile from 2008 to 2010.

== Career ==
Lewis served as a political science professor at the Institute of International Studies at the University of Chile from 2006 to 2011, where he acted as a researcher at the Asia-Pacific Center.

In 2007, Lewis co-founded the tourism company La Bicicleta Verde alongside Joel Martinez, offering bicycle tours of Santiago and the surrounding wine valleys. The Parks and Politics tour, which explored historical sites related to Chile’s political past, received media attention for its focus on the country’s history and governance. In 2014, the company received an award for innovation from the government of Chile. In 2015, musician Paul McCartney was photographed riding a La Bicicleta Verde bicycle while touring Santiago.

From 2007 to 2011, Lewis provided commentary on U.S. political affairs for CNN Chile. In 2015, Lewis was approached by Colomba Films after an appearance on the Chilean television program Vuelta a la manzana. He was subsequently offered a hosting role for Aquí te las traigo Peter, a documentary-style television series in which he explored various trades and cultural traditions in Chile.

The program aired for three seasons between 2018 and 2022. The first season premiered in 2018 on TVN, featuring 12 episodes. The second season, also on TVN, was released in 2019. The third season aired in 2022 on CNTV, with a focus on artisanal and historical trades. Throughout the series, Lewis documented stories from more than 100 different trades and occupations across Chile. These included waiters, gravediggers, lifeguards, parking attendants, window cleaners, professional wrestlers, surf instructors, wicker artisans, hip-hop instructors, florists, market vendors, blacksmiths, shoemakers and other traditional craftspeople.

In February 2021, Lewis launched the LTC Heroes podcast, where he interviews professionals in the long-term healthcare sector. As of October 2023, the podcast had produced 110 episodes.

In 2024, Lewis began hosting Sueño Americano, a Canal 13 documentary series that follows Chileans living across the United States and documents their pursuit of the “American Dream.”

That same year, he co-created People Worth Caring About, a docuseries developed with the Nebraska Health Care Association that highlights the stories of long-term care workers and aims to improve public perception of caregiving professions.

In 2026, Lewis directed Take Me to Mars, a documentary about Mars, a pygmy hippopotamus born at Tanganyika Wildlife Park in Kansas, and the keepers and conservationists involved in his care. The documentary premiered in Wichita on August 19, 2026.
