= Ralf Rogowski =

Law professor (born 1953)

Ralf Rogowski (* 2. July 1953 in Wilster, Germany) was Professor of Law and Director of the Law and Sociology Programme at the University of Warwick until 2022.. He is now Emeritus Professor at Warwick Law School and Affiliate Professor at Kazimieras Simonavičius University (KSU), Vilnius, Lithuania. He obtained his first and second legal state exams in Berlin, a Master of Laws (LLM) degree at the University of Wisconsin–Madison and a Phd (Dr. iur) at the European University Institute in Florence. He has taught at Lancaster University and the Free University in Berlin and was a research associate at the Wissenschaftszentrum für Sozialforschung (WZB) in Berlin and a visiting fellow at a number of universities, including the Universities of Konstanz, Maastricht and Wisconsin at Madison. From September to December 2006, he was Senior Emile Noel Fellow at New York University School of Law, in 2016 Visiting professor at the University of Modena and Reggio-Emilia, in 2017, 2019, 2021, 2022, 2023 and 2024 Visiting professor at the Faculty of Law of the University of Florence and in 2020 Visiting professor at the Faculty of Law of the University of Turin.He is member of the governing body of the Marco Biagi Foundation, Modena.

Rogowski is the general editor of the book series Studies in Modern Law and Policy and with S. Karstedt and D. Taenzler of the book series Law, Crime and Culture (both Routledge).

Rogowski is engaged in research on European employment law and labour market policy; theory and practice of reflexive labour law; law and policies of anticorruption; and constitutional courts in Germany and the United States.

== Book publications ==
- R Rogowski (ed) Research Handbook on Law and Systems Theory (Elgar 2026)
- R Rogowski (ed) The Anthem Companion to Niklas Luhmann (Anthem 2023)
- R Rogowski, T Gawron (eds) Constitutional Courts in Comparison: The US Supreme Court and the German Federal Constitutional Court (Berghahn 2016)
- J-C Barbier, R. Rogowski, F Colomb (eds) The Sustainability of the European Social Model (Elgar 2015)
- R Rogowski, Reflexive Labour Law in the World Society (Elgar 2013)
- R Rogowski, R Salais, N Whiteside (eds) Transforming European Employment Policy: Labour Market Transitions and the Promotion of Capability (Elgar 2011)
- R Rogowski (ed) The European Social Model and Transitional Labour Markets: Law and Policy (Ashgate 2008)
- T Gawron, R Rogowski, Die Wirkung des Bundesverfassungsgerichts (Nomos 2007)
- R Rogowski, C Turner (eds) The Shape of the New Europe (CUP 2004)
- K Schoemann, R Rogowski, T Kruppe, Labour Market Efficiency in the European Union (Routledge 1998)
- R. Rogowski (ed.) Civil Law (New York University Press 1996)
- G. Wilson, R. Rogowski (eds) Challenges to European Scholarship (Blackstone 1996)
- R Rogowski, T Wilthagen (eds) Reflexive Labour Law. Studies in Industrial Relations and Employment Regulation (Kluwer 1994)
