= Woll =

Woll may refer to:

- Woll (surname)
- WOLL, an American radio station
- Woll, Scottish Borders, a village
