= Foundation programme =

Foundation programme may refer to:

- Foundation programme (pre-undergraduate courses)
- Foundation Programme (United Kingdom medical education)
