= Social Science Research Center =

Social Science Research Center may refer to the following entities:

- The Social Science Research Center Berlin, a research institution in Berlin since 1969
- The Social Science Research Center (MSU), a research institution at Mississippi State University since 1950
