= Institute of international studies =

Research center or school on international studies,

An institute of international studies (or institute for international studies) is a type of research center or school that focuses on international studies, international relations, or area studies. It is often, though not always, part of a university or college where it is often affiliated with, and sometimes funded by, a university's public policy, public administration, or international relations school, a degree-granting institution. These centers may also provide geographic areas of specializations, offer internship or study-abroad opportunities, and/or give support services to university students.

One of the earliest centers for international studies was founded in 1935 at Yale University. The Yale Institute of International Studies (1935-1951) sought to establish a central point of contact for teaching and research on international affairs, societies, and cultures. Its successor today is the MacMillan Center for International and Area Studies. Some scholars felt that scholars at the institute conducted too much research as individuals rather than in groups. Eight of these scholars moved to Princeton University where they founded the Center of International Studies in 1951. Institutes similar to those at Yale and Princeton soon emerged in the 1950s at Harvard University and the Massachusetts Institute of Technology.

Some of these institutions are think tanks and focus on both military strategy and international diplomacy (the two being interlinked). Examples include the International Institute for Strategic Studies and the Center for Strategic and International Studies. This article focuses mainly on the academic institutes.

== United States ==
List of institutes for international studies in the United States
Institute Name	University Affiliation (if applicable)	Year founded
Weatherhead Center for International Affairs	Harvard University	1958
Princeton Institute for International and Regional Studies	Princeton University	1951; reorganized in 2003
MacMillan Center for International and Area Studies	Yale University	1935; renamed in early 1980s; see also Yale Institute of International Studies
Freeman Spogli Institute for International Studies	Stanford University	1987
Watson Institute for International Studies	Brown University	1979
Middlebury Institute of International Studies at Monterey	Middlebury College	1955
Joseph H. Lauder Institute of Management & International Studies	University of Pennsylvania	1983
Duke University Center for International Studies	Duke University	
Institute of International Studies	University of California, Berkeley	
MIT Center for International Studies	Massachusetts Institute of Technology	1951
Mortara Center For International Studies	Georgetown University	2003
David M. Kennedy Center for International Studies	Brigham Young University	
University of Pittsburgh Center for International Studies	University of Pittsburgh	1968
Center for Global Studies	University of Illinois at Urbana–Champaign	2000

== Other countries ==
- Institute for International Studies at University of Technology Sydney, Australia
- Center for International Legal Studies, Austria
- Montreal Centre for International Studies of the University of Montréal, Canada
- Munk Centre for International Studies of the University of Toronto, Canada
- Institute of International Relations Prague, Czech Republic
- Danish Institute for International Studies, Denmark
- Institute of International Studies at Universitas Gadjah Mada, Indonesia
- International Center for Persian Studies, Iran
- Vidal Sassoon International Center for the Study of Antisemitism, Jerusalem, Israel
- Center for International and Regional Studies, Qatar
- International Centre for Studies into Communism, Romania
- CEI International Affairs of the University of Barcelona, Spain
- Bandaranaike Centre for International Studies, Sri Lanka
- Graduate Institute of International and Development Studies, Geneva, Switzerland
- Institute of International Studies at Ramkhamheang University, Thailand
- International Centre for Policy Studies, Ukraine
- International Centre for Prison Studies of the University of Essex, UK

== See also ==
- List of schools of international relations
- International studies
