= Anita Gohdes =

German academic and political scientist

Anita Gohdes (born 1986 in Germany) is a German academic and political scientist working at the intersection of international security and technology. She is currently Professor of International and Cyber Security at the Hertie School in Berlin, Germany.

== Career ==
Gohdes holds a Master of Science in Human Rights and Research Methods from the University of Essex, a Bachelor of Arts in Political and Administrative Science from the University of Konstanz, and a PhD in Political Science from the University of Mannheim (Germany).

Prior to her current position at the Hertie School, she was Assistant Professor of International Relations at the University of Zurich, and a postdoctoral fellow at the Belfer Center’s International Security Program and the Women and Public Policy Program at the Harvard Kennedy School of Government.

In addition to her academic work, she has worked with the Human Rights Data Analysis Group since 2009. In 2019, she partnered with Amnesty International on their investigation of the lethal consequences of internet shutdowns in Iran. Gohdes also serves as an Associate Editor for the Journal of Peace Research.

She has spoken at numerous academic conferences, and also given talks at conferences including the Chaos Communication Congress and re:publica, including others.

== Honours and awards ==
In 2015, Gohdes received the Deutscher Studienpreis, awarded by the Körber Foundation, for her work investigating how the Assad regime in Syria actively used the internet to spy on and target opposition members.

In 2016, Gohdes received the Walter Isard Dissertation Award, given every two years by the Peace Science Society International.

In 2024, she was named as one of Berlin's top 100 minds in science by media outlet Tagesspiegel, for her outstanding contributions to teaching and research in the areas of internet censorship, cyber policy, and state action.

In 2024, she was awarded the Goldsmith Book Prize in a ceremony at the Harvard Kennedy School, given by the Shorenstein Center at the Harvard Kennedy School, for her book Repression in the Digital Age: Surveillance, Censorship, and the Dynamics of State Violence.

== Publications ==
=== Books ===
- Repression in the Digital Age: Surveillance, Censorship, and the Dynamics of State Violence. Oxford University Press, 2024. ISBN 9780197772614
