= Berlin Graduate School for Transnational Studies =

International relations school in Berlin, Germany

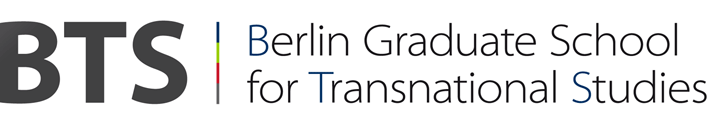
- Established: 2008
- Dean: Markus Jachtenfuchs
- Location: Berlin, Germany
- Website: www.transnationalstudies.eu

The Berlin Graduate School for Transnational Studies (BTS) is a cooperative project of three scientific institutes and institutions: the Free University Berlin, the Hertie School of Governance, and the Social Science Research Center Berlin. It constitutes a platform for research in transnational and international relations. BTS offers an English-language PhD programme for graduate students in the field of transnational and international relations, defined as an interdisciplinary field of research encompassing Political Science, History, Economics, Law and adjacent disciplines.

== Faculty ==
Among other, the following scholars are part of the BTS Core Faculty:

- Helmut Anheier
- Thomas Risse
- Michael Zürn

== Awards ==
Since 2010, BTS is part of the DAAD programme "International Promovieren in Deutschland". The programme is funded by the German Federal Ministry of Education and Research and supports the internationalization strategies of structured PhD programmes.

Together with the Hebrew University of Jerusalem, BTS received financial support in the framework of the "Berlin Jerusalem Initiative to Enhance Cooperation in the Social Science", sponsored by the Einstein Foundation Berlin.
