= Center for Global Studies =

US research center

The Center for Global Studies (CGS) was founded in 2000 by Prof. Edward Kolodziej at the University of Illinois at Urbana–Champaign (UIUC). CGS serves as a resource for faculty, students, staff, and the public on global studies. CGS is also responsible for globalizing the research, teaching, and outreach missions of the University of Illinois at Urbana-Champaign (UIUC). In 2019, the Center became part of the Illinois Global Institute, which was established in the same year.

Steven Witt has served as the Director of the Center for Global Studies since 2015.

CGS has been a National Resource Center, as designated by the U.S. Department of Education, since 2003. It is also a member of the Global Studies Consortium.
