= Cornelia Woll =

German–French political economist

Cornelia Woll is a German–French political economist and president of the Hertie School in Berlin. Her research focuses specifically on regulatory issues in the European Union and United States.

== Early life and education ==
Woll holds a bi-national Ph.D. in political science from the University of Cologne and Sciences Po Paris, completed in 2005. She also obtained a Habilitation in Political Science from the University of Bremen in 2013. Additionally, she earned a master's degree (M.A.) in International Relations from the University of Chicago in 2000 and a bachelor's degree (B.A.) in Political Science from the same institution in 1999.

== Career and Presidency ==
Woll served as a research fellow at the Max Planck Institute for the Study of Societies in Cologne from 2002 to 2006.

After 2006, Cornelia Woll held several prominent academic and leadership positions, including co-director of the Max Planck Sciences Po Center (2019–2022), before becoming the president of the Hertie School in Berlin in 2022. Woll succeeded Henrik Enderlein, who died in 2021, and took over from acting president Prof. Mark Halleberg. Her focus is to guide the school in an era of digital transformation, promoting diversity.
