= People Worth Caring About =

American television documentary series

People Worth Caring About is an American documentary series created by Peter Murphy Lewis. The series highlights the lives and contributions of caregivers in long-term care facilities across the United States. It aims to shed light on the often-overlooked individuals who provide essential care to the elderly and disabled.

== Overview ==
The series debuted in 2024 and has since released multiple seasons, each focusing on different states, including Nebraska, Ohio, New Mexico, and Kentucky. Each episode covers the daily experiences of caregivers, their challenges, and their impact on the lives of those they care for.

== Production ==
Peter Murphy Lewis, a former international television host and certified nursing assistant, conceptualized the series after recognizing the lack of representation and appreciation for caregivers in mainstream media. The production involves close collaboration with local healthcare associations and facilities to authentically portray the caregiving environment.

== Reception ==
People Worth Caring About has been praised for its heartfelt storytelling and authentic depiction of caregivers' lives. The series has garnered attention from various media outlets and has been featured on platforms such as Amazon Fire TV, Roku, Apple TV, and Samsung TV.

- Nebraska Edition: Focuses on caregivers in seven Nebraska nursing homes and assisted living communities.
- Ohio Edition: Highlights the dedication of long-term care workers across Ohio.
- New Mexico Edition: Showcases the experiences of caregivers in New Mexico's long-term care facilities.
- Kentucky Edition: Explores the lives of caregivers in Kentucky's healthcare settings.
