= Robert Lepenies =

German professor and university president

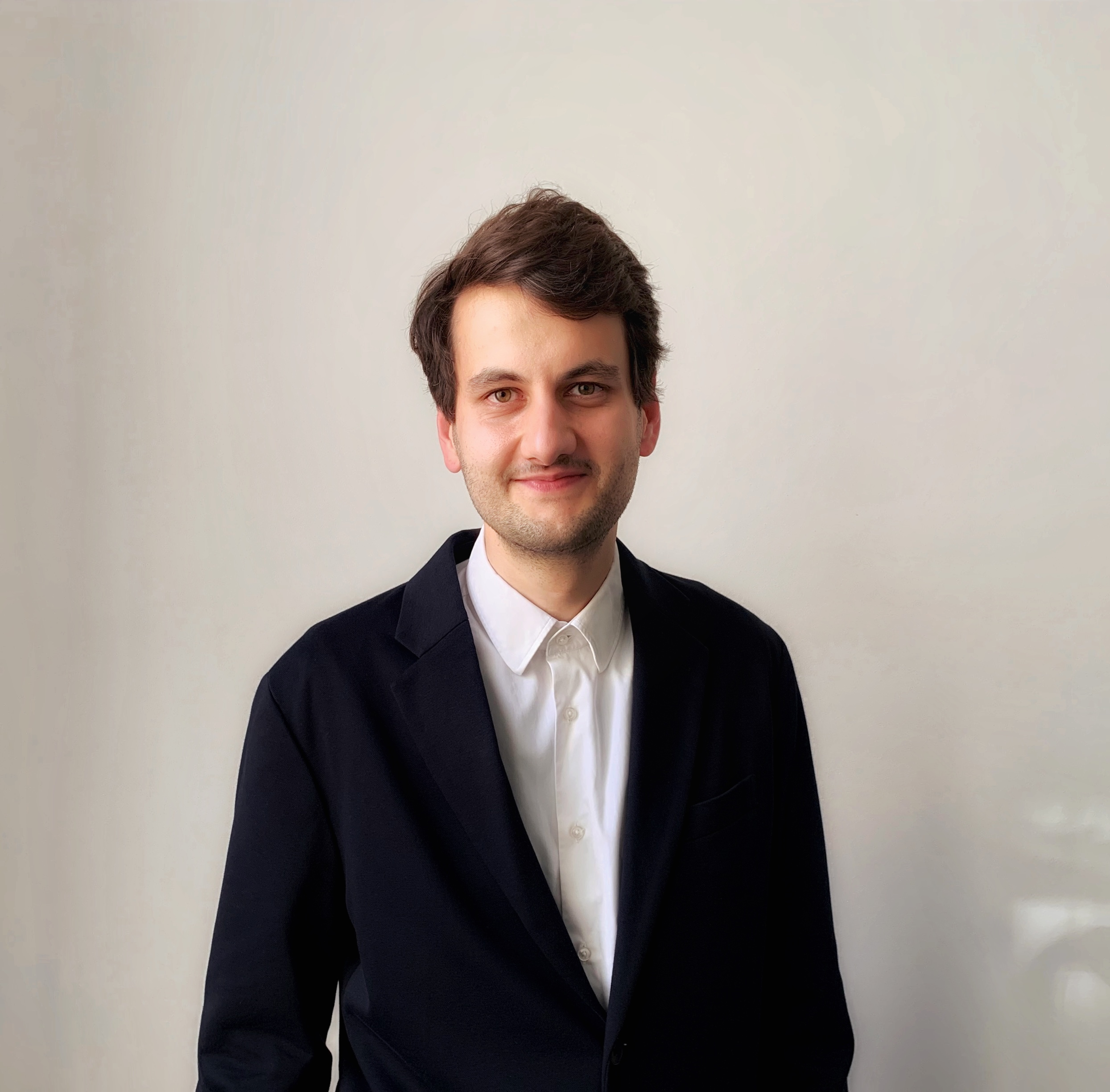
Prof. Dr. Robert Lepenies 2022

Robert Lepenies (born 22 May 1984) is a German political scientist and economist, currently employed as the president of the Karlshochschule International University.

== Life ==
Lepenies studied politics, philosophy, and economics at the University of Oxford, UK, graduating with a bachelor's degree in 2008. He completed his master's degree in International Political Economy at the London School of Economics in 2014. He went on to the Hertie School of Governance Berlin and received his PhD in Political Science with a thesis entitled "Losers in Trade: Economics and Normative Justifications."

He conducted research at Yale University, USA, with a Fulbright-Schuman Fellowship, at the European University Institute, Italy, with a Max Weber Fellowship, and as a WZB ASK Prize Recipient at the Berlin Social Science Center (WZB). In 2017, he became a Research Scientist at the Helmholtz Centre for Environmental Research in the Department of Environmental Politics. In October 2022, he became the president of the private Karlshochschule in Karlsruhe, Germany. There he teaches Plural Economics, Globalization Studies, Environmental Policy, and Behavioural Economics, among other subjects.

In 2015, he received the German Young Academics Award for Plural Economics. In 2016, he was elected to the Global Young Academy for 'Scientific Excellence and Service' and to its executive committee in 2019 and 2020.

== Publications ==
=== Peer-reviewed journal articles (selection) ===
- Herzog, L. and Lepenies, R., 2022. Citizen Science in Deliberative Systems: Participation, Epistemic Injustice, and Civic Empowerment. Minerva, pp. 1–20.
- Hüesker, F. and Lepenies, R., 2022. Why does pesticide pollution in water persist?. Environmental Science & Policy, 128, pp. 185–193.
- Lehmann, P., de Brito, M.M., Gawel, E., Groß, M., Haase, A., Lepenies, R., Otto, D., Schiller, J., Strunz, S. and Thrän, D., 2021. Making the COVID-19 crisis a real opportunity for environmental sustainability. Sustainability Science, pp. 1–9.
- Lehmann, P., Beck, S., de Brito, M.M., Gawel, E., Groß, M., Haase, A., Lepenies, R., Otto, D., Schiller, J., Strunz, S. and Thrän, D., 2021. Environmental Sustainability Post-COVID-19: Scrutinizing Popular Hypotheses from a Social Science Perspective. Sustainability, 13(16), p. 8679.
- Lepenies, R. and Zakari, I.S., 2021. Citizen Science for Transformative Air Quality Policy in Germany and Niger. Sustainability, 13(7), 3973, 1-21.
- Lyytimäki, J., Salo, H., Lepenies, R., Büttner, L., and Mustajoki, J., 2020. Risks of producing and using indicators of sustainable development goals. Sustainable Development, 1–11.
- Zingraff-Hamed, A., Schröter, B., Schaub, S., Lepenies, R., Stein, U., Hüesker, F., Meyer, C., Schleyer, C., Schmeier, S. and Pusch, M.T., 2020. Perception of Bottlenecks in the implementation of the European Water Framework Directive. Water Alternatives, 13, 458-483.
- Hendlin, Y.H., Arcuri, A., Lepenies, R., and Hüesker, F., 2020. The Politics of (Not) Assessing Glyphosate Concentrations in Aquatic Ecosystems. European Journal of Risk Regulation 11, Nr. 3: 539–64.
- Lepenies, R., Hüesker, F., Beck, S. and Brugnach, M., 2018. Discovering the political implications of coproduction in water governance. Water, 10 (10), 1475. 1-16.
- Lepenies, R., Mackay, K. and Quigley, M., 2018. Three challenges for behavioural science and policy: the empirical, the normative and the political. Behavioural Public Policy, 2(2), pp. 174–182.
- Lepenies, R., and Małecka, M., 2015. The Institutional Consequences of Nudging – Nudges, Politics, and the Law. Review of Philosophy and Psychology 6, Nr. 3: 427–37.

=== Peer-reviewed book articles (selection) ===
- Hahn, H. and Lepenies, R., 2017. Wissenschaft als politischer Beruf: Die Sustainable Development Goals als realistische Utopie. In Globale politische Ziele, edited by Lepenies P. & Sondermann E., 169–94. Nomos Verlagsgesellschaft mbH & Co. KG.
- Lepenies, R., and Małecka, M., 2019. Behaviour Change: Extralegal, Apolitical, Scientistic? In Handbook of Behavioural Change and Public Policy, edited by Straßheim, H. & Beck, S., 344-60, Edward Elgar.
- Malecka, M. and Lepenies, R., 2018. Is the Behavioral Approach a Form of Scientific Imperialism?: An Analysis of Law and Policy. Scientific Imperialism Exploring the Boundaries of Interdisciplinarity, edited by Uskali Mäki, Adrian Walsh, Manuela Fernández Pinto. Routledge Studies in Science, Technology and Society. pp. 254–273.
- Kersting, F., Lepenies, R. and Neef, T., 2019. Mehr als nur Werkzeuge. In Perspektiven einer pluralen Ökonomik (pp. 209–229). Springer VS, Wiesbaden.
- Lepenies, R., and Małecka, M., 2019 “The Ethics of Behavioural Public Policy“. In The Routledge Handbook of Ethics and Public Policy, edited by Lever, A. and Poama, A., 513–25. Routledge.

=== Books ===
- Beck, V., Hahn, H., and Lepenies, R., Eds. 2020. Dimensions of Poverty: Measurement, Epistemic Injustices, Activism. Philosophy and Poverty. Springer International Publishing. 441 pages. (reviewed in Erasmus Journal for Philosophy and Economics; Review of Income & Wealth; Studies of Transition States and Societies)
