= Klaus Hurrelmann =

German scientist

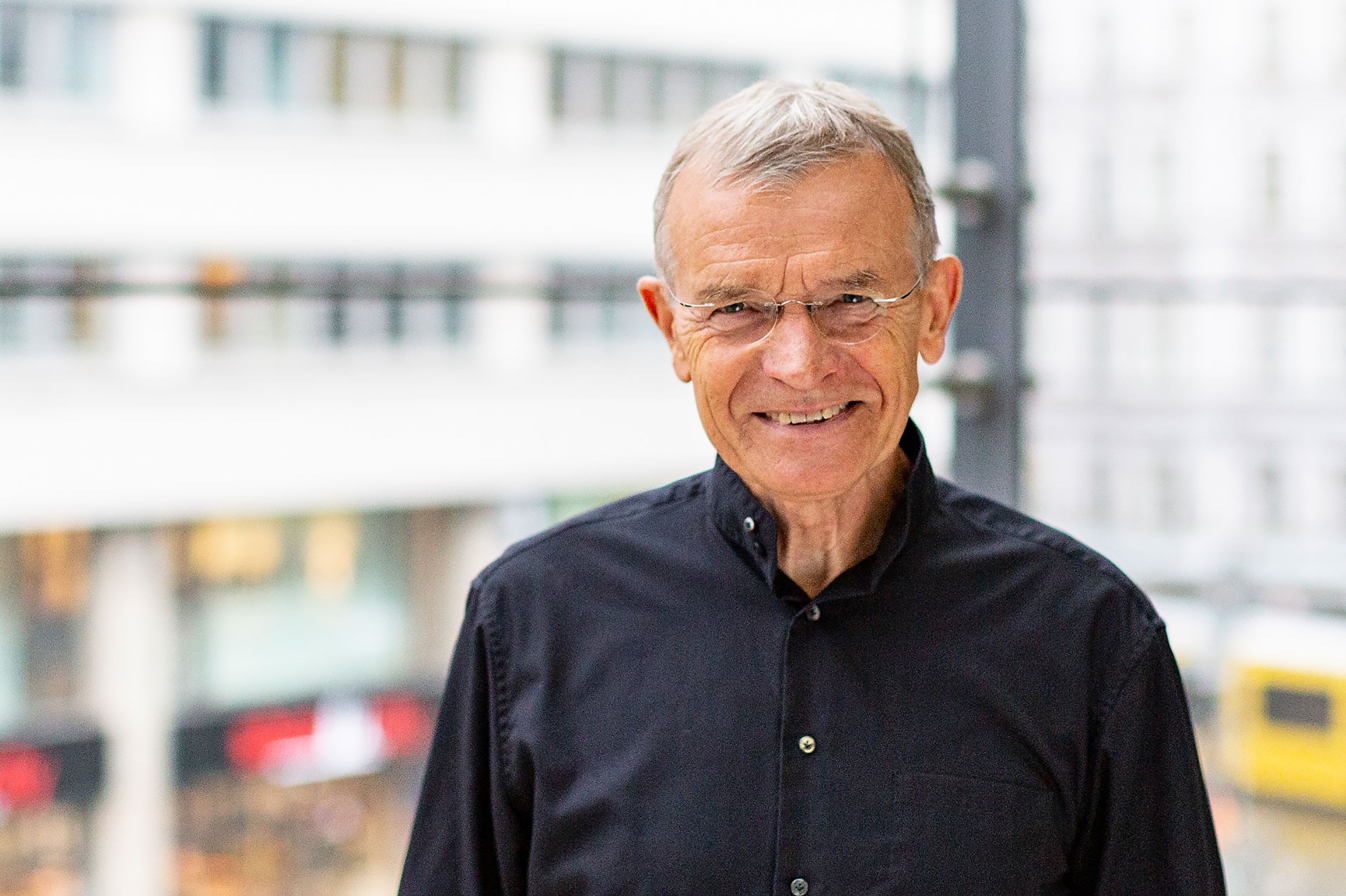
- Hurrelmann in 2020
- Born: January 10, 1944 (age 82); Gdynia (then Gotenhafen, Germany; now Poland)

Klaus Hurrelmann (born January 10, 1944) is a senior professor of public health and education at the Hertie School in Berlin, Germany.

Klaus Hurrelmann was born in Gdynia (then Gotenhafen, German: Gdingen) and studied sociology, psychology and education in Berkeley (USA), Freiburg and Münster.

== Biography ==
Klaus Hurrelmann first married Bettina Hurrelmann, who later became professor of German studies at the University of Cologne and died in 2015. They have one daughter, Annette Hurrelmann, who is Head of Unit for Budget Management in the Directorate-General for Agriculture and Rural Development of the European Commission in Brussels, and one son, Achim Hurrelmann, who is Professor of Political Science at Carleton University in Ottawa, Canada. His second marriage is with Doris Schaeffer, professor of public health, nursing and health sciences research at Bielefeld University, who brought one son into the marriage (Merlin Schaeffer, Professor of Sociology, University of Copenhagen, Denmark).

== Education ==
Hurrelmann studied sociology, psychology, and education at the universities in Münster and Freiburg as well as at the University of California at Berkeley (US). He gained his diploma in sociology in 1968. He was awarded a doctorate in sociology at the University of Münster in 1971 for his work on the social and institutional determinants of education. In 1975, he gained his postdoctoral habilitation at Bielefeld University for work on the educational system and society.

== Academic career ==
Hurrelmann started his academic career as a research assistant. In 1975, he became professor of education and socialization at the University of Essen. In 1980, he was appointed professor of socialization research at Bielefeld University. Hurrelmann was the first dean of the newly founded Faculty of Educational Science. In 1986, he founded the Collaborative Research Centre “Sonderforschungsbereich Prevention and Intervention in Childhood and Adolescence.” Funded by the German Research Foundation (DFG), this centre was made up of as many as 15 interdisciplinary research teams.

In 1993, Hurrelmann switched to the newly founded Faculty of Health Sciences at Bielefeld. He was elected the Founding Dean and was responsible for building up the first School of Public Health in Germany. He took over research in the field of prevention and health promotion. Commissioned by the World Health Organization (WHO), he founded the Collaboration Centre for Child and Adolescent Health Promotion. Until 2012, this Centre coordinated the representative health survey of 11- to 15-year-olds in Germany carried out throughout Europe as part of the Health Behaviour in School-aged Children (HBSC) study. Each assessment wave included more than 6,000 randomly selected school children from all parts of Germany. From 1996 to 2006, he was also Director of the Institut für Bevölkerungsforschung und Sozialpolitik (Institute for Demographic Research and Social Policy).

In March 2009, Hurrelmann became professor of public health and education at the Hertie School – University of Governance in Berlin. His main research interest is to develop a comprehensive theory of socialisation, on the theoretical level, and to develop comprehensive intervention strategies for preventing social disadvantage and health impairments in childhood and adolescence, on the empirical research level.

In 2025, Hurrelmann was appointed deputy chair of the advisory board of DigitalSchoolStory.

== Other activities ==
- National Action Plan Health Literacy, Board of Editors
- Member of the Federal Minister of the Interior's Council of Experts on Demography

== Recognition ==
- 2003 – Prize of the Swiss Dr. Margrit Egnér Foundation for his life's work (with an award of 25,000 Swiss francs)
- 2018 – Honorary doctorate, Pedagogical University of Freiburg

== Research ==
Hurrelmann's research focuses on four closely interconnected fields: socialisation, childhood and adolescence with a particular emphasis on generational research, education, and health. His work in all four areas is based on the Model of Productive Processing of Reality (MPPR), an interdisciplinary and meta-theoretical framework that he developed to explain the relationship between individual personality development and social conditions. The core assumption of this model is that “personality does not form independently from society any of its functions or dimensions but is continuously being shaped, in a concrete, historically conveyed life world, throughout the entire space of the life span”.

The model integrates perspectives from sociology, psychology, educational science, health science, and social medicine. Its central assumption is that individuals actively process their internal reality, including their physical and psychological characteristics, and their external reality, including their social, cultural, economic, and ecological environments. Personality development is understood as a continuous process of negotiating and integrating these two dimensions of reality.

The MPPR provides a common theoretical foundation for Hurrelmann's research across the four fields. In socialisation research, it serves to analyse the development of personality and identity in changing social environments. In childhood, adolescence, and generational research, it is applied to the developmental tasks and formative experiences of different age groups and generations. In educational research, it provides a framework for investigating the influence of family, schools, and other educational institutions on individual development, learning, and social inequality. In health research, it is used to examine the relationship between social conditions, individual coping strategies, health behaviour, and physical and mental well-being. The model thus establishes conceptual connections between research areas that are often investigated separately.

=== Socialisation research ===
Central to Hurrelmann's theory of socialisation is the tension between the individual and society. He defines socialisation as the individual's personality development resulting from productively processing internal and external reality. An individual's internal reality is formed by bodily and mental dispositions and traits; the external reality, by the properties of the social and physical environment. The processing of reality is productive because individuals live their lives actively and try to master the developmental tasks they have to face during the entire life course.

The MPPR places the human subject in a social and ecological context that must be absorbed and processed subjectively. The human being as an autonomous subject has the lifelong task to harmonize the processes of social integration and personal individualization. Across the entire life span, individuals master this task in age-appropriate steps matching their level of development. These “developmental tasks” are: education/qualification, attachment/social contacts, consumption/regeneration, and participation/value orientation. In this sense, socialisation consists in a complex “continuous work on one's own personality.” It may succeed, but, under unfavourable conditions, it may also fail. Failure leads to problems with identity, personality, and health.

=== Childhood, adolescence, and generation research ===
Klaus Hurrelmann has concentrated on applying his developmental task concept to the life phases of childhood and adolescence. He identifies the central developmental tasks in infancy and early childhood as gaining a basic emotional trust, developing communication skills and attachment behavior, developing the ability to express oneself verbally, identifying with one's own gender, and building up basic sensory and motor skills. In later childhood from the age of six onward, these tasks are joined by developing female or male role behavior; learning basic skills in reading, writing, and arithmetic; and forming competencies in dealing with the media and leisure time. This approach understands children as autonomous subjects who are productively engaged in shaping their lives.

Hurrelmann conceives adolescence as an autonomous life phase that has inserted itself between childhood and adulthood over the last 100 years. This phase of life generally lasts for about 15 years. Nowadays, it is beginning earlier than ever before in human history, because children reach puberty at an increasingly early age. At the other end, however, adolescence is more open than ever before and has become basically unplannable. This impacts on the mastering of developmental tasks: In the areas of education and qualification the demands are rising; the separation from parents and the development of own attachments are being postponed, and the acquisition of competencies as a consumer, user of media, economic citizen, as well as participation in politics and society are more and more considered as tasks that have to be managed on one's own responsibility. As a consequence, several developmental problems arise. According to Hurrelmann, social background and gender are the main determinants for the successful completion of the developmental tasks to be mastered during this phase of life. In this regard, male adolescents seem to have problems coping with these developmental tasks to an increasing extent.

Drawing on the work of Karl Mannheim, Hurrelmann links this approach to generational research. He postulates that different generations develop specific strategies for coping with reality. The young generation born after 2000, often referred to as Generation Z, responds with strong political activism. In his book GenZ, he analyses the emergence of this politicization in the face of global crises such as the pandemic, climate change, and economic instability. However, because in most highly developed societies the political majority is held by middle-aged and older generations, the demographic weight of younger people remains weak. As a result, their concerns are often marginalized in government decision-making, even though they are disproportionately affected by these crises. This lack of political influence has begun to fuel doubts among many young people about the responsiveness of democratic structures.

As a response, Hurrelmann proposes establishing “generation dialogues” across all areas of society. These dialogues aim to integrate the perspectives and life experiences of all age groups while ensuring that younger generations gain an active and recognised role. He emphasizes that such dialogue must address not only rational arguments but also emotional dimensions, including values and identity. Hurrelmann warns that a society which fails to provide room for the ideas and impulses of younger generations risks eroding their trust in democratic institutions and, in the long run, undermining its own capacity for renewal.

His theoretical approaches to adolescence have been applied in many empirical studies. Alongside the Collaborative Research Centre “Prevention and Intervention in Childhood and Adolescence,” these particularly include the Shell Youth Studies. Klaus Hurrelmann designed the new generation of Shell Youth Studies that have been carried out since 2002 together with the Infratest-Kantar social research institute. Recently, these have been joined by studies on vocational training and career choices in youth and on future pensions and finances of adolescents and young adults.

=== Educational research ===
Klaus Hurrelmann's work in educational research focuses on how the starting conditions in families along with the way schools are organized determine academic success and failure. He uses his socialisation theory to explain this in terms of differences in the guidance and support given by parents.

Klaus Hurrelmann's studies show how the design of the school system in Germany and the teaching process also contribute to the poor performance of children from families with low socioeconomic status. The early tracking of students into the three-tier system of Hauptschule, Realschule, and Gymnasium following elementary school systematically disadvantages children who receive little encouragement to learn in their families. Ever since the 1970s, Klaus Hurrelmann has been calling for Hauptschule, Realschule, and comprehensive schools to be merged into one type of integrated school with its own senior classes oriented toward the labor market and careers that will offer an educational alternative to the academic Gymnasium. This should reduce the pressure on parents and children to decide on the future course of education at the young age of 10 years. All school-leaving qualifications should be possible at both types of school. This approach, which he calls the “two-path model,” was introduced in the East German federal states in 1989/90 following the unification of the two Germanys. Since then, many West German federal states have also adopted this reform.

Klaus Hurrelmann emphasizes the need to promote both achievement-related and social competencies in all educational institutions. An important element of such approaches is to integrate the promotion of exercise, good nutrition, and relaxation techniques in school curricula to help children and adolescents to master their age-specific developmental tasks. Klaus Hurrelmann also calls for parents and professional childcare and teaching personnel to cooperate intensively in negotiating their different childrearing concepts. He bases this approach on a “Magical childrearing triangle” with the three poles “Recognition”, “Encouragement”, and “Guidance”. He also supports compulsory parent training and favors the introduction of a symbolic “parenting license.”

=== Health research ===
Klaus Hurrelmann's work in health research focuses on the interface between the sociology of health and health education. He has taken a leading role in this field.

His definition of health has been very influential: „Health describes the objective and subjective state of well-being that is present when the physical, psychological, and social development of a person is in harmony with his/her own possibilities, goals, and prevailing living conditions. Health is impaired when demands that arise in one or more of these areas cannot be coped with by the person in his/her respective stage of life“. This definition is now being viewed as a further development of the traditional definition of health from the World Health Organization (WHO) and helps to understand health as an interaction between people and their public environment.

An important line of research for Klaus Hurrelmann is prevention and health promotion. Many of his research projects have focused on the social determinants of health and illness in children and adolescents. They show how the social inequality among children and adolescents also extends to health. They focus particularly on analyzing the health-related behaviour of children and adolescents.

=== Methodological approach ===
A characteristic feature of Hurrelmann's research is the systematic combination of theoretical modelling and empirical investigation. His research projects frequently employ quantitative methods, particularly representative cross-sectional and longitudinal surveys, supplemented where appropriate by qualitative approaches. These studies investigate the influence of family, education, social inequality, and societal change on personality development, educational achievement, health, and social participation. Particular attention is given to the prevention of developmental and health-related risks, including violence, addictive behaviour, psychological distress, and psychosomatic disorders.

An important objective of this empirical research is to provide regular, empirically grounded portraits of specific population groups, particularly children, adolescents, and young adults. By systematically documenting their attitudes, values, experiences, aspirations, and concerns, these studies seek to make their perspectives visible and give them a stronger voice in public debates. Repeated surveys also make it possible to identify changes over time and to compare the experiences of different generations.

Many of these studies are designed not only to contribute to academic research but also to inform public discussion and policy development. Their findings are frequently disseminated through newspapers, television, radio, and digital media, generating public debate about education, generational relations, social inequality, health, and social change. This combination of interdisciplinary theory, empirical social research, and public communication represents a distinctive feature of Hurrelmann's scientific work.

== Publications (selection) ==
=== Textbooks in English ===
- Developmental Tasks in Adolescence (2019). London/New York: Routledge, ISBN 978-1-138-32243-1
- Social Structure and Personality Development (2009). New York. Cambridge University Press, ISBN 978-0521-35747-0
- Human Development and Health (1989). New York. Springer, ISBN 978-3-642-74330-6
- Socialisation During the Life Course (2018). Milton Park: Routledge, ISBN 978-1-138-50218-5
- Gen Z Between Climate Crisis and Coronavirus Pandemic (2021). London/New York: Routledge, ISBN 978-0-367-65280-7
- Hurrelmann, K. /Richter, M.: Understanding Public Health. Productive Processing of Internal and External Reality. London: Routledge 2020, ISBN 978-0-367-36076-4

=== Handbooks/Readers in English ===
- Social Networks and Social Support in Childhood and Adolescence (1994). Berlin/New York: De Gruyter, ISBN 978-3110143607
- Social Problems and Social Contexts in Adolescence (1996). New York: Aldine, ISBN 978-0202361017
- Health Hazards in Adolescence (1990). Berlin/New York: De Gruyter, ISBN 978-3110124484
- Health Risks and Developmental Transitions during Adolescence (1997). New York: Cambridge University Press, ISBN 978-0521480536
- Individualization in Childhood and Adolescence (1996). Berlin/New York: De Gruyter, ISBN 978-3110146813
- International Handbook of Public Health (1996). Westport: Greenwood Publishers, ISBN 978-0313295003
- International Handbook of Adolescence (1994). Westport: Greenwood Publishers, ISBN 978-0313285844
