= Jutta Allmendinger =

German sociologist (born 1956)

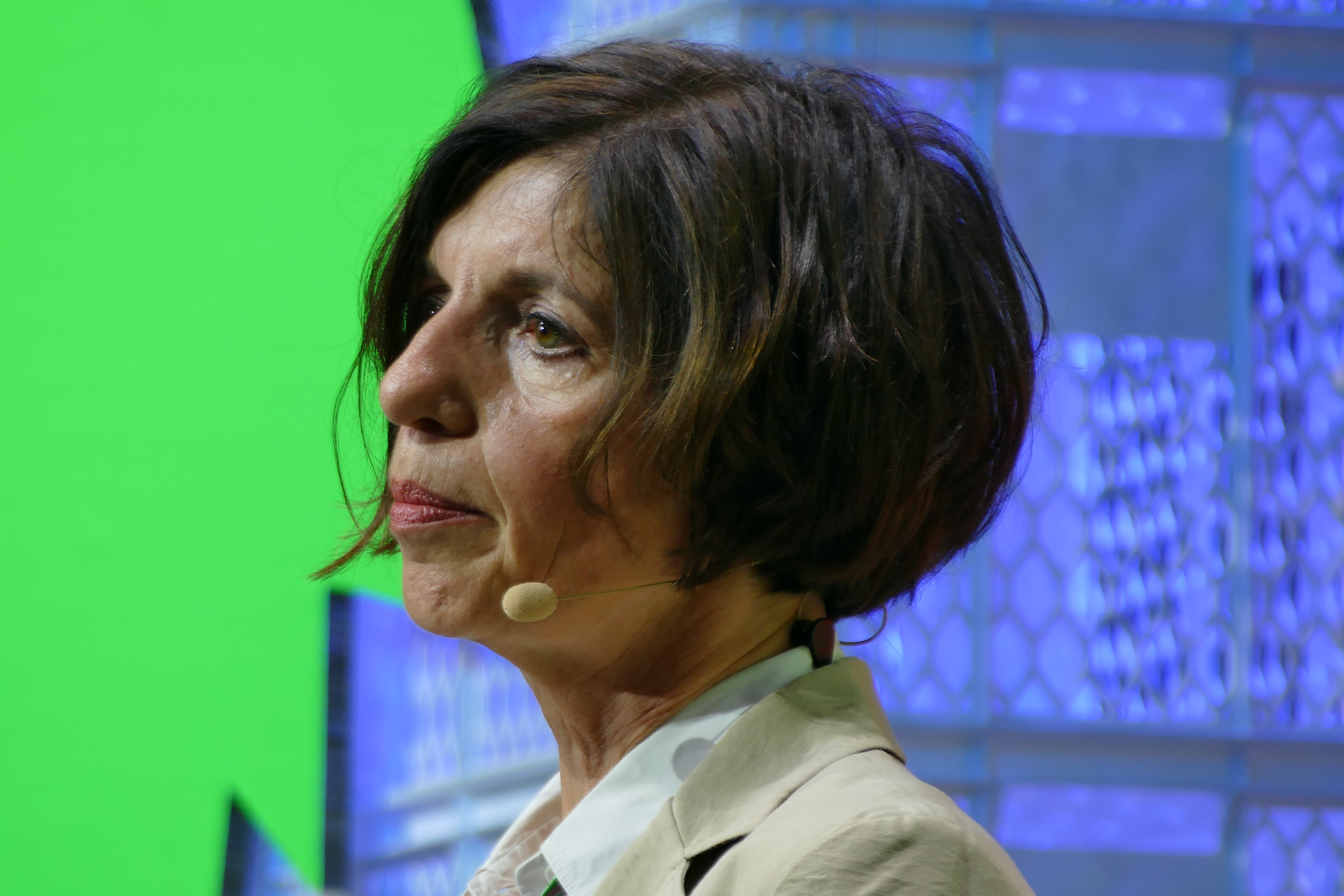
- Born: 26 September 1956 (age 70); Mannheim, West Germany

Academic background
- Education: University of Mannheim; University of Wisconsin–Madison; Harvard University (Ph.D., 1989)

Academic work
- Discipline: Sociology
- Sub-discipline: Sociology of education; sociology of organizations; sociology of work; social inequality; social policy
- Institutions: LMU Munich; Humboldt University of Berlin; WZB Berlin Social Science Center

Jutta Allmendinger (born 26 September 1956) is a German sociologist who has been serving as professor of educational sociology and labor market research at Humboldt University since 2007. She was president of the WZB Berlin Social Science Center from 2007 to 2024.

She is also a senior fellow at the Center for European Studies at Harvard University.

== Early life and education ==
Allmendinger studied sociology and social psychology at the University of Mannheim and sociology, economics and statistics at the University of Wisconsin–Madison. In 1989, she earned her Ph.D. in social studies at Harvard University.

== Career ==
Allmendinger worked at the Max Planck Institute for Human Development in Berlin from 1988 and 1991, followed by an employment at Harvard Business School (1991/92). From 1992 to 2007, she was a full professor of sociology at LMU Munich (on leave from 2003 to 2007). She also served as director of the Institute of Employment Research (IAB) at the Federal Employment Agency in Nuremberg from 2003 until 2007. Between 1999 and 2002, she was chairperson of the German Sociological Association.

In April 2007 Allmendinger became president of the WZB Berlin Social Science Center and was appointed professor of educational sociology and labour market research at Humboldt University of Berlin. Since 2012 she has also been an honorary professor of sociology at Free University of Berlin.

== Research ==
Allmendinger's research interests focus on social inequality, education, and labor markets.

== Role in politics ==
Allmendinger is a member of the Social Democratic Party of Germany (SPD). She served as a member of the advisory board of the Commissioner of the German Federal Government for Migration, Refugees and Integration, Maria Böhmer. When Federal President Joachim Gauck announced in June 2016 that he would not be available for reelection, Allmendinger was soon mentioned by German media as likely successor.

More recently, Allmendinger was appointed as chair of the Zukunftsrat of the Hesse State (inaugurated by Thorsten Schäfer-Gümbel) and to the German government's so-called "coal commission", which was tasked to develop a master plan on how to phase-out coal as an energy source and create a new economic perspective for the country's coal-mining regions.

On the international level, Allmendinger was a member of the High Level Economic Expert Group "Innovation for Growth" (I4G) of the European Commission (2012–2014), appointed by European Commissioner for Research, Science and Innovation Máire Geoghegan-Quinn. When the United Kingdom assumed the presidency of the G7 in 2021, she was appointed by the United Kingdom's Minister for Women and Equalities Liz Truss to a newly formed Gender Equality Advisory Council (GEAC) chaired by Sarah Sands.

== Other activities ==
Allmendinger serves in numerous advisory boards in Germany and abroad. Between 2006 and 2012 she was a member of the Scientific Commission of the German Council of Sciences and Humanities (Wissenschaftsrat), between 2007 and 2011 of the Commission of Experts for Research and Innovation established by the German government. Since 2016 she has been a member of the supervisory board of the Berlin City Cleaning (BSR), and since 2017 she has been the co-editor of the weekly newspaper Die Zeit.

Allmendinger is a member of the Berlin-Brandenburg Academy of Sciences and Humanities, the Bavarian Academy of Sciences and Humanities, the Academy of Sciences Leopoldina, the National Academy of Science and Engineering (acatech), and the Pontifical Academy of Social Sciences.

Other board memberships include:

- University of Mannheim, Member of the Supervisory Board (since 2019)
- Cologne Institute for Economic Research (IW), Member of the Research Advisory Council
- Urania, Member of the Board of Trustees
- German Museum of Technology, Member of the Board of Trustees (2009–2020)
- Jacobs University Bremen, Member of the Board of Trustees (2007–2018)
- Technical University of Darmstadt, Member of the Board of Trustees (2005–2009)

== Recognition ==
Allmendinger has received a number of awards: DAAD-Scholarship for postgraduate studies at the University of Wisconsin, Madison, USA (1983/84), Krupp Fellowship (1986), Harvard Dissertation Merit Fellowship (1987/88), Award of the "Münchener Universitätsgesellschaft" for extraordinary achievements in teaching (1996), Fellowship at the Center for Advanced Study in Behavioral Sciences, Stanford, CA, USA (1996–1997), Award of the "Deutscher Frauenring" (2003), Communicator Award (Stifterverband, 2009), Berlin Women Award (2011), TUM Distinguished Affiliate Professorship of the Technical University of Munich (2011), Order of Merit of Berlin (2012), Soroptimist International German Promotional Award (2012), Waldemar-von Knoeringen Award (2012), Schader Award of the Schader Foundation (2013), Honorary Doctorate of the University of Tampere (2014), senior fellow at the Center for European Studies of Harvard University (2015), Marsilius-Medal of the Heidelberg University (2016), Helge-Pross-Award of the University of Siegen (2017). Allmendinger was awarded with the Thomas Mann Fellowship 2018 of Villa Aurora and Thomas Mann House.
