= Foundation programme (pre-undergraduate courses) =

Introductory course to a degree curriculum

A foundation programme (also referred to as foundation program, foundation year, foundation year programme or foundation year program) is a one-year introductory, pre-undergraduate course that prepares students for entry into a full multi-year degree curriculum and is offered by many universities in the Commonwealth of Nations and elsewhere. These programmes may be intended for students not yet in a degree program or may form part of a specific degree course. Some programmes are designed specifically for either domestic or international students.

== United Kingdom ==
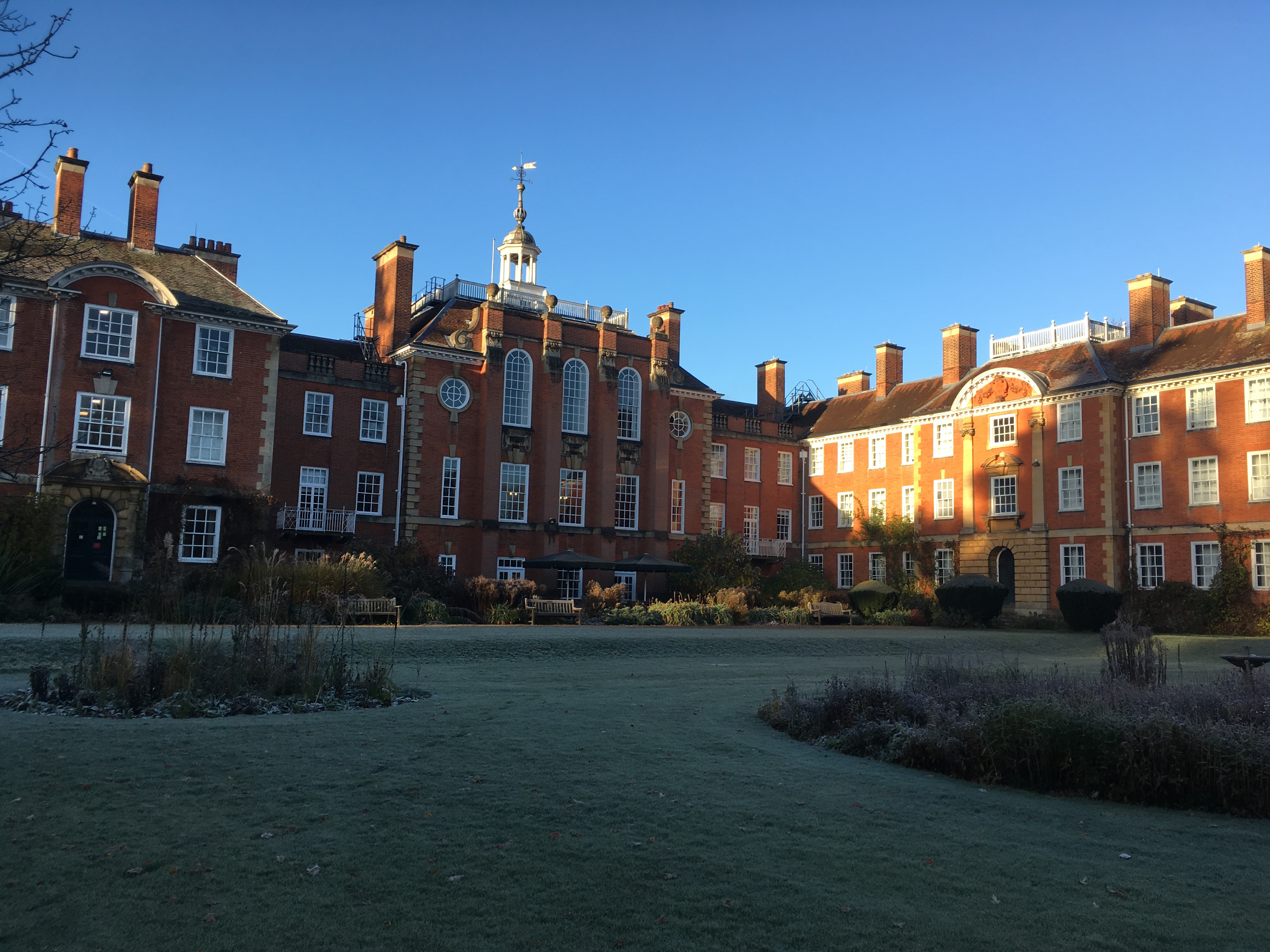
Lady Margaret Hall - the only Oxbridge college to offer a foundation year exclusively to disadvantaged students

In the UK, foundation year programmes, also known as "year zero" or "gateway programmes", are designed to develop skills and subject-specific knowledge to prepare a student for a degree course. They may be offered as stand-alone one-year courses or integrated into degree programmes. Some programmes are for students who have not received suitable grades at A Level or IB while others are aimed at students who did not have the opportunity to take such qualifications. As of January 2023, foundation year programmes were available at 122 institutions through UCAS.

Foundation programmes in England for home students that are integrated with degree programmes are eligible for student fee support at the same level as degree programmes. As of July 2023, the UK government is looking at whether fee levels (and student loan levels) for foundation years should be reduced. A government-commissioned report in July 2023 found that the cost of running foundation years is similar to, and in some cases could be higher than, the cost of running degree courses.

Lady Margaret Hall, Oxford offers a foundation year exclusively to students from poor socio-economic backgrounds. This aims to help them overcome disadvantages that would hinder their application process to the university.

=== International Foundation Year ===
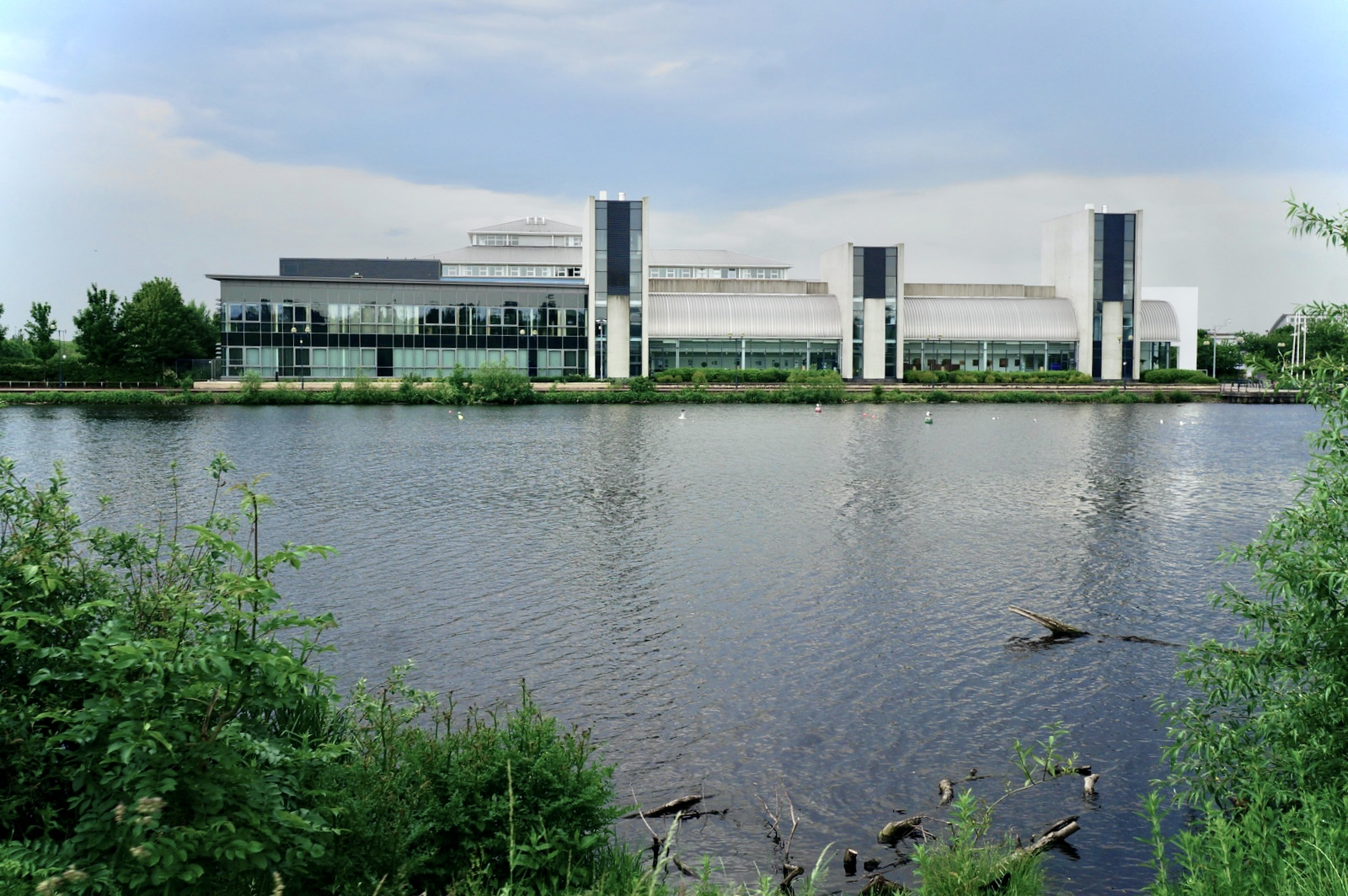
The International Study Centre at Durham University's Queen's Campus

For international students, universities often have on-campus partnerships with providers such as Study Group or INTO University Partnerships. Study Group offers international foundation year programmes in conjunction with a number of British universities including (as of December 2025) Aberdeen, Cardiff, Durham, Huddersfield, Kingston, Leeds, Leeds Beckett, Liverpool John Moores, Royal Holloway, Sheffield, Strathclyde, Surrey, Sussex, and Teesside. INTO University Partnerships partners with UEA, Exeter, Newcastle, Manchester, Queen's Belfast, City, Stirling and Lancaster. Some universities offer their own international foundation programmes, including Warwick (since 1983) and SOAS University of London, specifically for students who do not speak English as a first language (since 1985). UCL has offered Undergraduate Preparatory Certificate international foundation year courses since 1991. NCUK, created by a consortium of British universities in 1987, offers foundation years at accredited "NCUK Study Centres" in the UK and internationally, leading to a guarantee of an offer for successful students from an NCUK partner university, although not necessarily at the student's preferred university.

In January 2024, universities offering international foundation years were accused by the Sunday Times of allowing foreign students to "buy their way in" to top universities. In response, Universities UK requested a review of the quality of international foundation year programmes by the Quality Assurance Agency (QAA). It was also pointed out that the Sunday Times had compared admission requirements for international foundation years to those for admission to full degrees for home students. The QAA review found that there was broad equivalence between the entry requirements for international foundation years and domestic foundation years but that there were some differences in regulations, particularly regarding resitting examinations, that were more likely when the international foundation years were delivered by a partner provider rather than in-house by the universities themselves. Progression rates from foundation years to degree courses were identified as needing monitoring. However, commentators noted that this was based on voluntary responses from 34 institutions providing international pathways (of which 32 had international foundation years) out of 124 providers that had international pathways, making it possible that the responses are skewed towards institutions less likely to have problems. Thus, while the Russell Group universities that the Sunday Times article focused on have 'a clean bill of health', problems elsewhere in the sector may not have been uncovered by the report.

== Elsewhere in the world ==
At a number of universities in the United States, the SABIC Foundation Year Program is a university preparation course aimed specifically at Saudi students that will return to work for SABIC after completing a bachelor's degree in the US.

At Salem Kolleg by Lake Constance, Germany, Kolleg students are introduced to many different university courses over a period of three terms as part of their studium generale program.

At Constructor University in Germany, the Foundation Year Programme is a preparatory year.

At Karlshochschule International University in Germany, the Foundation Year Programme (Studienkolleg) is a preparatory year for international students.

At Maastricht University, the Netherlands, the Foundation Programme trains motivated international students to make them eligible (to apply) for a bachelor's programme at Maastricht University.

At the University of Queensland, the Foundation Year Programme is a university preparation program for students who are not citizens or permanent residents of Australia.

At Vanderbilt University, the Foundation Year Programme aims to prepare students from outside the United States to enter the American university system.
