= Bobby Woll =

Biographical details
- Born: January 30, 1911; Murphysboro, Illinois, U.S.
- Died: August 29, 1999 (aged 88); Monmouth, Illinois, U.S.

Coaching career (HC unless noted)

Football
- 1940: Monmouth (IL)

Basketball
- 1936–1954: Monmouth (IL)

Baseball
- 1936–1938: Monmouth (IL)

Head coaching record
- Overall: 0–7–2 (football); 182–105 (basketball); 5–25–1 (baseball)

Robert G. Woll (January 30, 1911 – August 29, 1999) was an American football player, coach of football, basketball, and baseball, and college athletics administrator. After lettering for three years in football, basketball and baseball at Monmouth College, Woll served there as a teacher, coach, and finally athletic director until his death in 1999.

The football field at Monmouth College is named for Woll.

== Head coaching record ==
=== Football ===
Year	Team	Overall	Conference	Standing	Bowl/playoffs
Monmouth Fighting Scots (Midwest Conference) (1940)
1940	Monmouth	0–7–2	0–6–1	9th	
Monmouth:		0–7–2	0–6–1		
Total:		0–7–2			
