= Global studies =

Study of global macro-processes

Global Studies (GS) or global affairs (GA) is the interdisciplinary study of global macro-processes. Predominant subjects are political science in the form of global politics, as well as business, economics, finance, law, the sociology of law, investment, ecology, environmental studies, technology, globalization, geography, sociology, psychology, culture, immigration, multiculturalism, anthropology, ethnography, history, future studies, human rights, social justice, and area studies, among many others. It distinguishes itself from the related discipline of international relations by its comparatively lesser focus on the nation state as a fundamental analytical unit, instead focusing on the broader issues relating to cultural and economic globalisation, global power structures, as well of the effect of humans on the global environment.

== Characteristics of Global Studies ==
Six defining characteristics of global studies were identified by scholars at the first annual meeting of the Global Studies Consortium in Tokyo in 2008:

- Transnationality; which highlights the focus on global processes, rather than the connections between individual states studied in international relations;
- Interdisciplinary: global studies scholarship can involve politics, economics, history, geography, anthropology, sociology, religion, technology, philosophy, health, as well as the study of the environment, gender, and race;
- Contemporary and historical examples range from the transnational activity of the Greek and Roman Empires to modern European colonialism;
- Postcolonial and Critical-theoretical in its approach: global studies often emphasize a postcolonial perspective, and attempt to analyze global phenomena through a critical-theoretical, multicultural lens. This includes critiquing perspectives on eurocentrism and orientalism within traditional conceptual frameworks.

== History and Context ==
The development of global studies in secondary and tertiary education is arguably a product of globalization and its consequent results on the international community. In the late 20th century, an unprecedented rise in communications technologies and computerization occurred around the world, again enhancing the processes of globalization: "it is a shift in our very life circumstances ... the speed of change is closely allied to the growth of communication, and development in information and communication technologies have been exponential ... globalization is a fact of life from which we cannot retreat." As a result of this constantly changing global community, education providers began to see a need for the introduction of global studies into secondary school curricula (i.e., introduction of global issues through already existing subjects), and to create global studies degrees for tertiary students (i.e. sole degrees with a global focus).

According to Jan Nederveen Pieterse, Mellichamp Professor of Global Studies and Sociology at the University of California, Santa Barbara:

The first Global Studies conference took place at the University of Illinois Chicago in 2008; the 2009 conference was held in Dubai on the theme Views from Dubai: The Gulf and Globalization. The 2010 conference was in Busan, South Korea under the heading Global Rebalancing: East Asia and Globalization; the 2011 conference took place in Rio de Janeiro on Emerging societies and Emancipation; the 2012 conference was at Moscow University on the theme of Eurasia and Globalization: Complexity and Global studies; and the 2013 conference took place in New Delhi on the theme of Social Development in South Asia.

The Global Studies Journal was founded in 2008 and is "devoted to mapping and interpreting new trends and patterns in globalization".

The adoption of "Global Studies" course in US high schools in the early 2000s has been characterized as a strategy to increase geography education without requiring teachers to be certified in the field of geography.

== Subjects of Interest ==
The field of global studies centers on the impacts of globalization and the growing interdependence among states, economies, societies, cultures, and people. Some of the most pressing issues in global studies are national security and diplomacy, effective citizenship in a participatory democracy, global competitiveness in a world market, and the desire to enter the aid and development sector.

=== National Security ===
The first major funding for international education was the 1966 International Education Act in the US. It provided funding to institutions of higher education to create and strengthen international studies programs. Created at the time of the Cold War, this act stressed the need for all citizens (with a focus on USA citizens) to understand global issues to build skills for diplomacy. "The importance of diplomacy as a driving force for political development is well known and understood. It is of great importance as a long term instrument for conflict prevention."

The development of global issues and crises, such as international terrorism, climate change, environmental degradation, pandemics (such as Ebola), and the Great Recession, has convinced policymakers of the importance of global studies and international education for national security and diplomacy.

=== Global Economy ===
A second motivation for global studies is facilitating a better understanding of the global marketplace. Many international companies have identified the need for a workforce with the skills to work cross-culturally and to identify and serve the needs of a global market. Some international companies, such as Microsoft, have taken the lead in convening policymakers and key stakeholders to demand additional investment in education. The US state and federal governments have also placed global studies as a key priority for preparing a competitive workforce. Furthermore, in 2002, the Australian federal government (through its development body AusAID) used some of its funding to introduce a 'Global Education Program'. This program aims to increase understanding of development and international issues among Australian students. It provides teachers with professional development opportunities with NGOs and thorough curriculum support. The program "informs and encourages teachers to introduce students to global issues in a classroom setting." Higher education institutions have closely followed by integrating international studies across disciplines. It is rare to find a leading business school without an international focus.

=== Global Citizenship and Rights ===
A third motivation for global studies is the creation of an effective citizenry. In the US, the National Council of Social Studies states that the purpose of social studies is to "teach students the content knowledge, intellectual skills, and civic values necessary for fulfilling the duties of citizenship in a participatory democracy." A key goal of the NCSS is "global education". As globalization causes the lines between national and international to become blurred, it becomes increasingly important for citizens to understand global relationships. The creation of effective Global citizenship results in people who are willing to, and have the capacity to become involved in local and global issues. In the UK, local government research in the areas surrounding London has found that citizens must have the opportunity to become involved and the skills, knowledge, and confidence to take part. The outcomes are often very positive, leading to improvements in services, higher-quality democratic participation, and community education.

To achieve effective citizenship, students must be educated in ways that engage them and emphasize the importance of global issues. By studying a subject such as global studies, students can gain the knowledge required to become effective citizens.

Some critical scholars note that, beyond content, students must be taught "global cognition" to understand global perspectives truly. These scholars believe that to understand global issues fully, students must recognize that their perspectives are not necessarily shared by others and understand the social forces that shape their views.

=== International Institutions ===
By 2006, the international development sector had expanded exponentially, with the "NGO sector now being the 8th largest economy in the world ... employing nearly 19 million paid workers." Financing health projects used to be the biggest issue in global aid, but private and public organizations like the Bill and Melinda Gates Foundation have helped overcome such problems. The issue now is ensuring that the money is used properly to help those in need of life's essentials. Studying global studies may lead to involvement in the aid and development sector in multiple ways. These can include working in post-conflict or natural-disaster zones, improving public services in developing communities (health, education, infrastructure, agriculture), or aiding private-sector growth through business and market models.

== See also ==
- Engaged theory – Comprehensive critical theory
- Futurology – Study of postulating possible, probable, and preferable futures
- Global justice – Issue in political philosophy
- Global Studies Consortium – International academic association
- Globalism – Group of ideologies that advocate the concept of globalization
- Globalization – Increasing worldwide interdependence
- International relations – Study of relationships between states
