= Karlshochschule International University =

Private university in Karlsruhe, Germany

Coordinates: 49.0066°N 8.3944°E

- Motto: Let's make a difference!
- Type: University of applied sciences
- Established: 2004
- Accreditation: FIBAA
- President: Prof. Dr. Robert Lepenies
- Vice-president: Prof. Dr. Dr. Björn Bohnenkamp
- Director: Angelika Habermann
- Faculty: 20
- Students: 500
- Location: Karlstrasse 36-38, D-76133 Karlsruhe, Karlsruhe, Baden-Wuerttemberg, Germany
- Campus: Urban
- Website: www.karlshochschule.de/en/

Karlshochschule International University is a state approved non-profit private foundation university based in Karlsruhe. It focuses with an inter- and transdisciplinary approach on critical management studies, cultural studies and social and political sciences.

== History ==
In 1903, the Merkur Akademie (M.A.I.) was founded. In 1992 the first Bachelor Programs were started. In 2004 "Merkur Internationale Fachhochschule - University of Applied Sciences" was founded and state approved, starting the first programs in 2005. On 27 May 2009 "Merkur Internationale Fachhochschule" was renamed to Karlshochschule International University. On April 1, 2017, the former Rhineland-Palatinate State Minister Eveline Lemke assumed the office of President. The appointment was the subject of critical media coverage, as Lemke did not hold a university degree. Lemke left the university in July 2017. Johann Schneider took over the office on an interim basis starting November 1, 2017. From autumn 2018, Michael Zerr once again led the university, before Robert Lepenies was appointed President on October 1, 2022.

== Programs ==
In 2009 programs were accredited by FIBAA. Since then, Karlshochschule was successful in being granted a systems accreditation by FIBAA that enables it to award the seal of accreditation for study programs through its own quality assurance mechanism. Degree include B.A. and M.A. programs in international business, digital transformation and ethics, and social transformation. The university currently offers both undergraduate and postgraduate programs.

== Partner universities ==
Karlshochschule International University is partnered with universities in Australia, China, Belgium, and other countries.
