= Helmut Anheier =

German-American academic

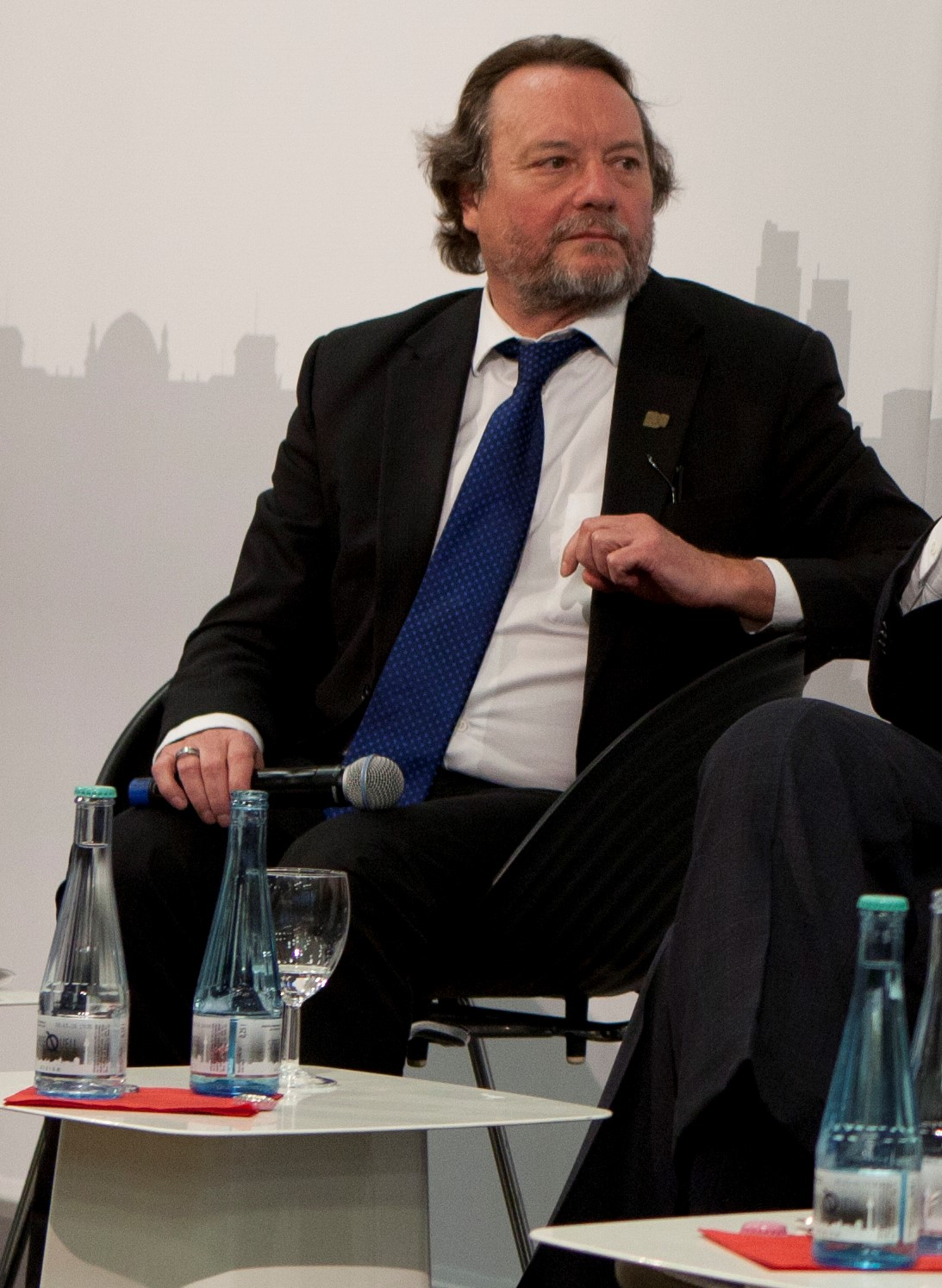
- Helmut K. Anheier at Hertie School Berlin, April 2016
- Born: January 4, 1954 (age 72)

Helmut K. Anheier (born January 4, 1954) is a German-American academic. He is professor of sociology and past president of the Hertie School in Berlin, and Adjunct Professor at the UCLA Luskin School of Public Affairs. Until September 2019 he held a chair at the Max Weber Institute of Sociology, Heidelberg University, where he was also the Academic Director of the Center for Social Investment and Innovation. His research interests include governance and policy research, civil society, culture, and organizational theory.

Anheier studied sociology and economics at the University of Trier in Germany (1976–80) and obtained a MA, MPhil and PhD at Yale's Department of Sociology (1981, 1982, 1986). At Yale University, he studied under Juan Linz, Paul DiMaggio, Walter Powell, Scott Boorman and Charles Perrow focusing on comparative sociology, social network analysis and organizational sociology.

In 1986, Anheier became assistant professor for comparative sociology and methodology at Rutgers University, and in 1988 joined the United Nations International Narcotics Control Board as a social affairs officer on a diplomatic track, where he worked on statistical estimates of the world supply and demand of controlled narcotic substances. In 1990, returning to Rutgers University, he also became co-director of the Johns Hopkins Comparative Nonprofit Sector Project, one of the largest social science projects of the 1990s, operating in over forty countries to measure the economic and social relevance of nonprofit organizations. In 1998, he moved to the London School of Economics, where Anheier held a Centennial Professorship (2001-2006), founded and directed the Centre for Civil Society with a focus on Europe. He then moved back to the US as Professor of Public Policy and Social Welfare (2001–11) at the University of California (UCLA), where he established another Center for Civil Society, this time with a focus on Southern California, philanthropy and globalization. While on leave from UCLA, he founded the Center for Social Investment and Innovation at Heidelberg in 2006, later joining the Max Weber Institute of Sociology, before taking on the helm of the Hertie School of Governance in 2009.

Initially, Anheier published mainly on comparative sociology, economic sociology, and social network analysis, and in the 1990s, increasingly on nonprofit organizations in an international perspective. In the 2000s, his publications were mostly on civil society and its comparative measurement as well as on nonprofit management and policy more generally. Since then, he has largely focused on these areas: the role of philanthropic foundations in the U.S. and Europe; social innovations; governance research, especially governance indicator systems, and cultural policy.

Author of many publications, he has received various international awards for his scholarship.

He holds both US and German citizenships, he was married to the late artist Emilia Birlo (1955- 2025)

== Selected bibliography ==
- Helmut K. Anheier and Diana Leat: Creative Philanthropy. New York, London: Routledge (2006).
- David Hammack and Helmut K. Anheier. A Versatile American Institution: The Changing Ideals and Realities of Philanthropic Foundations. Washington, DC: Brookings, (2013).
- Helmut K. Anheier (ed.): Governance Challenges & Innovations. Financial and Fiscal Governance. Oxford University Press (2013).
- Helmut K. Anheier, Matthias Haber and Mark Kayser (eds.) Governance Indicators: Impact and Promise. Oxford and New York: Oxford University Press (2018).
- Helmut K. Anheier and Diana Leat. The Ambiguity of Success: On the Performance of Philanthropic Foundations. London and New York: Routledge (2019).
- Helmut K. Anheier and Theodor Baums (eds.). Advances in Corporate Governance: Comparative Perspectives. Oxford and New York: Oxford University Press (2020).
- Helmut K. Anheier and Stefan Toepler (eds.). The Routledge Companion to Nonprofit Management. London: Routledge (2020).
- Helmut Anheier (ed.) The Future of the Liberal Democratic Order: The Key Questions. London and New York: Routledge (2022).
- Helmut K. Anheier and Stefan Toepler. Nonprofit Organizations: Theory, Management and Policy. 3rd edition, fully revised and expanded. New York and London: Routledge (2023).
- Helmut K. Anheier and Darinka Marković-Vastag. Gender Equality in the Creative Industries: A Comparative Study. London and New York: Routledge (2025).
- Helmut K. Anheier and Stefan Toepler. Nonprofit Organizations (3rd edition), Routledge (2023).
