= Ed Woll =

- Born: May 29, 1914; New York City, New York
- Died: December 17, 2010 (aged 96); Westwood, Massachusetts
- Education: Massachusetts Institute of Technology, Rensselaer Polytechnic Institute
- Employer: General Electric
- Known for: Jet propulsion engineering

Ed Woll (1914-2010) was an American engineer who developed the first modern gas turbine engines for General Electric.

Woll led development of the T58, T64, and T700 turboshaft engines. Woll also led the F404, F101, F110 turbofan military engines, and GE27, and CFM56 civilian engines.

== Early life ==
In 1946 Woll worked at the Power Plant Laboratory at Wright-Patterson Field in Dayton, Ohio and Edwards Air Force Base in California.

Woll developed the afterburner for the J35 engine, later developing the J47 variable afterburner.

== GE career ==
Woll led the General Electric T58 and T64 helicopter and turboprop engine programs starting in 1953 with innovations such as corrosion-resistant high-temperature coatings.

Woll was a lead in developing the J85, CJ610, and CF700 engines which enabled lightweight jet fighters, such as the Northrop F-5, Northrop T-38 trainers, and early business jets like the LearJet and Fanjet Falcon. Woll resisted the urge to consolidate GE engineering, saving the GE's Lynn (MA) River Works from shutdown.

In 1964, Woll led development of the 14,300 lbf (64 kN) thrust GE15 (later YJ101) which evolved into the F404 used in the McDonnell Douglas F/A-18 Hornet and other aircraft.

Woll later led the F101X, evolving (via the "Great Engine War") into the F110 used to re-engine the F-14, F-15, and F-16.

Championing customer service and support, Woll retired in 1979 after developing the CF6, and CFM56 with Snecma.
