= Berlin Graduate School of Social Sciences =

== History ==
Emerging from the Graduiertenkolleg “Das Neue Europa”, the Berlin Graduate School of Social Sciences has been founded in 2002. For a five-year period the BGSS has been a pilot project by the German Academic Exchange Service (German Deutsche Akademische Austauschdienst). In 2007 the Graduate School became an integral part of the Department of Social Sciences at Humboldt University Berlin. Since November 2007 the doctoral program is funded by the Excellence Initiative of the German federal and state governments.

== Research areas ==
Research at the BGSS is focused on the comparative analysis of social inclusion and democratic performance of modern societies. Recently, the role of knowledge in democratic societies has been added as a third research focus.

=== Varieties of inclusion ===
This research area is concerned with the question whether and how modern societies are able to cope with contemporary problems of inclusion and exclusion, discrimination and diversity, heterogeneity and individualization. Topics are:

- Social inequality, well-being and justice
- Social protest and social conflict
- Migration and cultural diversity
- Conflict in and management of collective identities

=== Varieties of democracy ===
This research area looks at the conditions of the establishment, stability and development of democratic structures in modern societies. Topics are:

- Performance of mature and young democracies
- Processes of democratization, and the resilience of autocracy
- Multilevel and multinational policy
- Political institutions, political conflict, and the welfare state

=== Varieties of knowledge ===
This research area is concerned with the role of scientific and non-scientific knowledge in the reproduction of democratic societies. Topics include:

- Scientific knowledge in processes of policy-making
- The impact of science on processes of inclusion and democratization
- Communicating knowledge in public spheres
- The governance of science

== Networks ==
The BGSS collaborates with the following non-university research institutions exchanging doctoral and senior researchers.

- Social Science Research Center Berlin (German Wissenschaftszentrum Berlin für Sozialforschung)
- Centre Marc Bloch
- Institute for Research Information and Quality Assurance (German Institut für Forschungsinformation und Qualitätssicherung)
- Hertie School of Governance
- German Institute for Economic Research (German Deutsches Institut für Wirtschaftsforschung)

The BGSS is host university of European PhD in Socio-Economic and Statistical Studies (SESS.EuroPhD), a consortium of European universities awarding the Doctor Europeus or European PhD. Since 2010, Craig Calhoun is Einstein Visiting Fellow at BGSS.

== Notable faculty members ==
- Klaus Eder (Director of BGSS)
- Jutta Allmendinger (WZB)
- Hans Bertram
- Talja Blokland
- Hans Blokland
- Jürgen Gerhards
- Ellen Immergut
- Markus Jachtenfuchs
- Ruud Koopmans
- Wolfgang Merkel (WZB)
- Herfried Münkler
- Hildegard Maria Nickel
- Michael Zürn (WZB)

== Doctoral researcher activities ==
In 2010 doctoral researchers of BGSS and WZB organized the “Berlin Summer School in Social Sciences – Linking Theory and Empirical Research”. They also publish an Online Working Paper Series.

== Sources ==
- Website of Berlin Graduate School of Social Sciences: Faculty retrieved on August 23, 2011.
- DAAD
- European PhD Portal
- WZB
