= Henrik Enderlein =

German political scientist and economist (1974–2021)

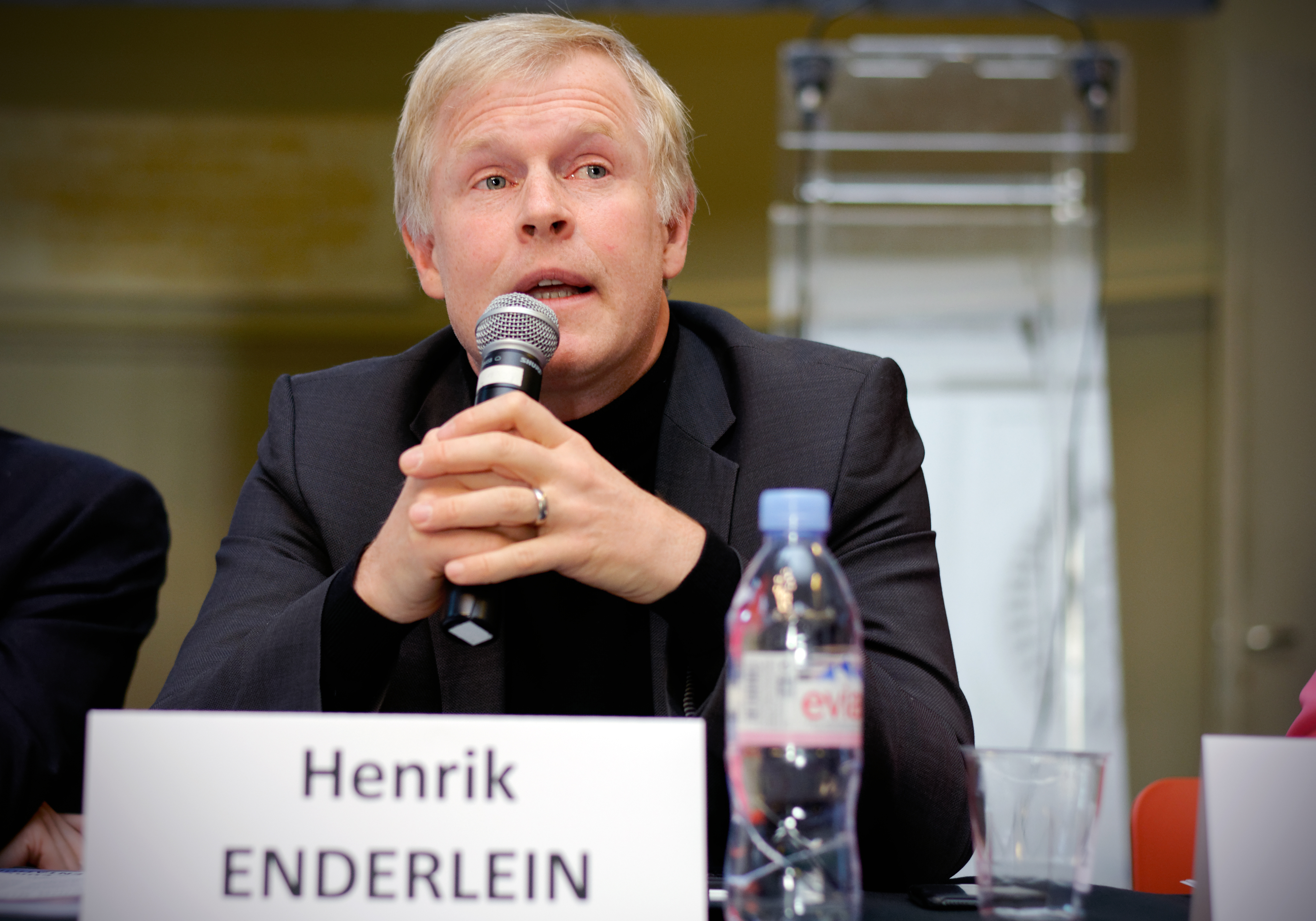
- Born: 13 September 1974
- Died: 27 May 2021 (aged 46)
- Education: Sciences Po; Columbia University
- Awards: Otto Hahn Medal
- Scientific career
- Fields: Economics; Political science
- Workplaces: Hertie School, European Central Bank

Henrik Enderlein (13 September 1974 – 28 May 2021) was a German economist and political scientist. He was president and professor of political economy at the Hertie School in Berlin and founding director of the Jacques Delors Centre at the Hertie School. He held degrees from Sciences Po, Columbia University and earned his PhD at the Max Planck Institute for the Study of Societies. From 2001 to 2003, he worked as an economist at the European Central Bank. He held visiting professorships at Harvard Kennedy School (Chair Pierre Keller, 2012–2013) and at Duke University (Chair Fulbright, 2006–2007).

== Life and career ==
Enderlein spent his childhood in Tübingen, a town in the German State of Baden-Württemberg. He studied Political Science and Economics at Sciences Po in Paris. He then started a doctoral fellowship at Columbia University in New York from 1998 to 1999, where he earned an M.A. From 1999 to 2001 he became a researcher at the Max Planck Institute for the Study of Societies in Cologne and completed his PhD. His thesis supervisor was Fritz W. Scharpf.

Enderlein worked at the EU Institutions and Fora Division of the European Central Bank from 2001–2003, before becoming Assistant Professor in Economics at the Free University of Berlin. He joined the Hertie School as founding member of the faculty in 2005. From 2013 to 2017, he served as founding member on the independent German Fiscal Council (Unabhängiger Beirat des Stabilitätsrats), a body devised as part of Germany’s national implementation of the European Fiscal Compact.

In 2014, Enderlein founded the Berlin-based Jacques Delors Institute, a think-tank focusing on European integration, which was integrated into the Hertie School as Jaques Delors Centre in 2018. It combines a think-tank arm and a research arm and is one of the largest research centres on Europe in Germany.

Enderlein held visiting positions at Duke University (USA) as Fulbright Distinguished Chair (2006–2007), Harvard University as Pierre-Keller Visiting Professor at Harvard Kennedy School and the Weatherhead Center for International Affairs (2012–2013), and at the European University Institute as visiting fellow at the Robert Schuman Centre for Advanced Studies (2017–2018).

In September 2018, Enderlein became president of the Hertie School of Governance in Berlin.

Enderlein was considered a friend and political ally of French President Emmanuel Macron. In 2014, he co-authored “Reforms and Investment and Growth: An Agenda for France, Germany and Europe” (with Jean Pisani-Ferry), a report commissioned by the Ministers for Economic Affairs Emmanuel Macron of France and Sigmar Gabriel of Germany. The Report sparked controversy in France at the time, but later became a blueprint for Emmanuel Macron's program as candidate for the French Presidency, which Jean Pisani-Ferry oversaw as campaign director.

On 17 February 2021, the Hertie School announced that Enderlein would step down as President of the School effective on 1 March 2021. Enderlein disclosed that his decision was driven by having been diagnosed with stage 4 melanoma (a form of skin cancer) in late 2020. Enderlein died of complications resulting from cancer on 27 May 2021 at age 46.

To honor Enderlein's memory, the Hertie School established the Henrik Enderlein Prize, which is awarded annually to a European researcher in the social sciences under the age of forty, whose work is considered to have made an outstanding contribution in her or his field.

== Research ==
Enderlein's research focus was on the European Union, in particular economic policy-making in the Eurozone and on the study of sovereign debt crises.
