= Hertie School =

Public policy school in Berlin, Germany

Coordinates: 52°30′46″N 13°23′21″E

- die private Hochschule Hertie School (German)
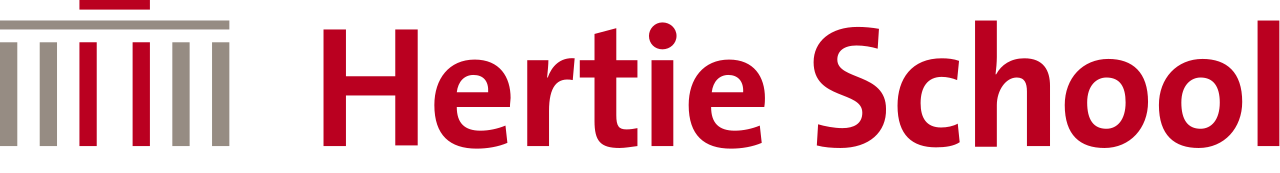
- Hertie School of Governance
- Former name: Hertie School of Governance
- Motto: Understand today. Shape tomorrow.
- Type: Private
- Established: 2003
- Academic affiliations: TPC
- Budget: €30.2 million
- President: Daniela Schwarzer
- Dean: Andrea Römmele, Mark Hallerberg, Thurid Hustedt
- Director: Axel Baisch
- Students: 1,032
- Doctoral students: 69
- Location: Berlin, Germany
- Campus: Urban
- Colours: Red, grey, and white
- Website: www.hertie-school.org

The Hertie School (until 2019 Hertie School of Governance) is a German private, independent graduate school for governance (public policy, international affairs and data science) located in Berlin. Hertie School is accredited to confer master's and doctoral degrees. Half of the school's students are international, with more than 95 countries represented among alumni and currently enrolled students. The working language is English.

The research focus of the Hertie School, which has existed since its founding, lies in the analysis of the conditions, structures, and dynamics of governance.

Since 2018, the Hertie School has established five research centres (Centres of Competence) that focus on future key governance challenges: the Centre for International Security, the Centre for Digital Governance, the Centre for Fundamental Rights, the Jacques Delors Centre and the Centre for Sustainability (from 2021). Additionally, the School's Data Science Lab uses research in data science and artificial intelligence (AI) to tackle major societal problems.

== History ==
The Hertie School was founded by the Hertie Foundation, which is based in Frankfurt. The Hertie Foundation was named after the Hertie department store, which in turn was named after its founder Hermann Tietz (Her-Tie). The last owner of the Hertie department store provided the funds used to create the Hertie Foundation.

The school was established in 2003 as one of the first European professional schools for public policy. Since 2008 it has been located in the Quartier 110 building on Friedrichstrasse in Berlin. The first study program offered was the Master of Public Policy (MPP). In 2015, the Master of International Affairs (MIA) was added. The Master of Data Science was set up in 2021.

In February 2005, the Hertie School was awarded state recognition as a college of higher education by the Berlin Ministry of Science, Research, and Culture (Senatsverwaltung für Wissenschaft, Forschung und Kultur).

In October 2017, the Hertie School once again received full accreditation to confer doctoral degrees for another ten years.

In February 2019, the Hertie School announced that it would move to the Robert Koch Forum from summer 2025 to enable its growth plans. The historic Robert Koch Forum is currently being renovated by the city of Berlin with a budget of 87 million euros.

== Enrollment and Degrees ==
As of September 2026, a total of 1,032 students were enrolled in the school. This includes 69 doctoral students. There are over 3,600 alumni.

Predominantly, Hertie School's students have backgrounds in law, economics, political science and international relations and pursue a Master of Public Policy, Master of International Affairs or Master of Data Science for Public Policy degree. The Hertie School also offers an Executive Masters of Public Administration.

== Academic programmes ==
The Hertie School currently offers three Master programmes, an executive Master, and a PhD programme:

- Master of Public Policy (MPP)
- Master of International Affairs (MIA)
- Master of Data Science for Public Policy (MDS)
- Executive Master of Public Administration (EMPA)
- PhD programme in governance as part of the Berlin Graduate School for Transnational Studies (BTS), a joint endeavour of the Free University of Berlin (FUB), the Hertie School and the WZB Berlin Social Science Center.

In autumn 2012, the Hertie School welcomed its first PhD cohort. PhD candidates take core curriculum courses in their first year while beginning their dissertation research and are expected to complete their PhDs within three years.

== Student life ==
Students of the Hertie School are engaged with a number of student clubs, including the students' magazine The Governance Post, the Diplomacy Club, the Latin America Club, the Pride Network, Cinema Politica, The Work, Economy & Social Policy Club, and many more. The Hertie Student Representatives (HSR) act as the student government. In March 2026, the student government was Germany's first-ever to formally endorse the Boycott, Divestment, and Sanctions (BDS) campaign.

== Notable alumni ==
=== Academia ===
- Robert Lepenies, German academic
- Elena Bascone, Charlemagne Prize fellow 2023/2024

=== Politics ===
- Besa Shahini, Albanian politician (Alumni Achievements Award winner 2019)
- Damian Boeselager, German politician (Alumni Achievements Award winner 2020)
- Alexandru Nazare, Former Minister of Finance of Romania
- Ruslan Codreanu, Moldovan politician

== Faculty ==
Notable faculty include Cornelia Woll, Helmut Anheier, Joanna Bryson, Klaus Hurrelmann, Wolfgang Ischinger as well as Anita Gohdes.

== Partnerships ==
The Hertie School has established dual degree programs with the MPP Programme at the School of Public Affairs at Sciences Po in Paris, the School of International and Public Affairs (SIPA) at Columbia University in New York City, the MGA and MPA programmes at Munk School of Global Affairs and Public Policy in Toronto, the MPP Program at the University of Tokyo, the MPA Programme at the London School of Economics and Political Science (LSE), the Programme in Government and International Organizations at Bocconi University in Milan and the Atlantis dual degree with the Maxwell School at Syracuse University.

The Hertie School also has partnerships in the Berlin education landscape: with the WZB Berlin Social Science Center, the Freie Universität Berlin (FU), the Humboldt-Universität zu Berlin (HU), the ESMT European School of Management and Technology, and the University of Potsdam.

The Hertie School is a member of The European University of Social Sciences, or CIVICA. It is also a member of the Open Society University Network (OSUN). The school is a member of the Association of Professional Schools of International Affairs (APSIA).

Furthermore, the Hertie School is a member of key political science and policy analysis associations. These include the European Consortium for Political Science Research (ECPR), the American Political Science Association (APSA), the Association of Professional Schools of International Affairs (APSIA), PolicyNet, and the Global Public Policy Network (GPPN). The Global Public Policy Network is an international group of top public policy schools from around the world.
