= WZB Berlin Social Science Center =

German research unit

Coordinates: 52°30′23″N 13°21′57″E

- Former name: International Institute of Management – Wissenschaftszentrum Berlin
- Type: Public
- Established: 1969
- Parent institution: Leibniz Association
- Director: Nicola Fuchs-Schündeln
- Location: Berlin, Germany
- Website: https://www.wzb.eu/en

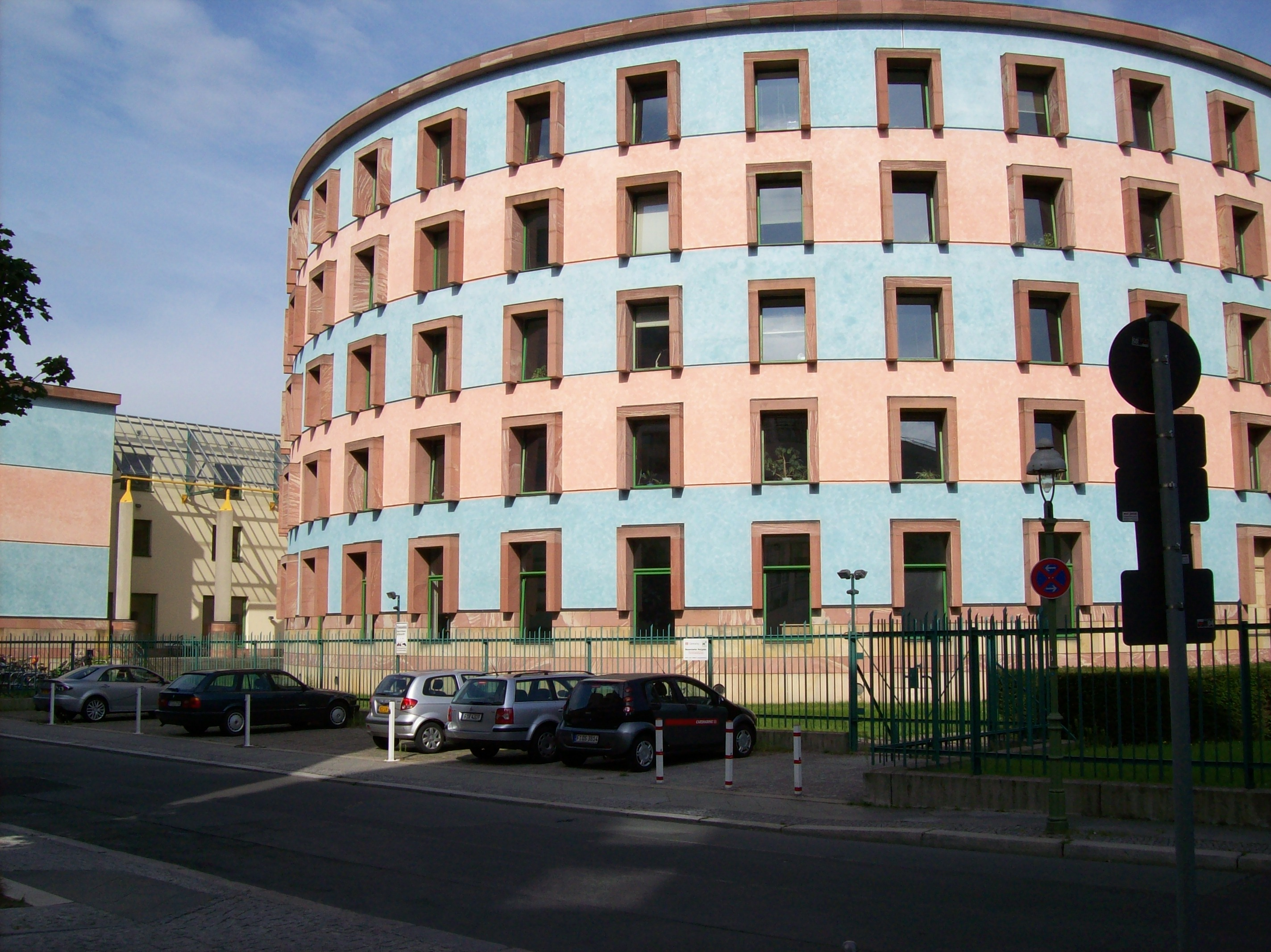
WZB Berlin Social Science Center

The WZB Berlin Social Science Center (German: Wissenschaftszentrum Berlin für Sozialforschung, WZB), also known by its German initials WZB, is an internationally renowned research institute for the social sciences, the largest such institution in Europe not affiliated with a university.

It was founded in 1969 through an all-party initiative of the German Bundestag. Around 140 German and foreign sociologists, political scientists, economists, historians, statisticians, computer scientists and legal scholars work in the WZB conducting basic research on selected social and political issues, concentrating on the industrialized societies of Japan and the West, as well as the transformations of Central and Eastern Europe and China. The question of globalization is of particular importance.

== Research areas ==
The WZB is organized into seven research areas:

1. Dynamics of Social Inequalities
2. Markets and Choice
3. Digitalization and Societal Transformation
4. International Politics and Law
5. Dynamics of Political Systems
6. Migration and Diversity
7. Political Economy of Development

Constituted as a non-profit limited liability company (GmbH), ownership is shared between the federal government (75 percent) and the city-state of Berlin (25 percent). WZB is a member of the Gottfried Wilhelm Leibniz Scientific Community.

Although not a university body, it collaborates with Free University of Berlin, Hertie School of Governance, Humboldt University, Technische Universität Berlin, Berlin University of the Arts, as well as with research institutions in Berlin and abroad. Many WZB scientists are also university professors or hold teaching assignments.

Recent presidents of the WZB have included Meinolf Dierkes (1980–1987), Wolfgang Zapf (1987–1994), Friedhelm Neidhardt (1994–2000), and historian Jürgen Kocka (2001–2007), Jutta Allmendinger (2007–2024). The current president is economist Nicola Fuchs-Schündeln.

WZB is said to be the largest such research institution for the social sciences in Europe. Around 140 social scientists are conducting research on the developmental trends, problems of adaptation, and possibilities for innovation in modern societies.

The Federal Republic of Germany and the federal state of Berlin have been shareholders and main funders since 1976.

WZB headquarters on Landwehrkanal in Berlin-Tiergarten was designed 1979–1988 by the British architects James Stirling and Michael Wilford integrating the 1894 building of Reichsversicherungsamt.

== A.SK Social Science Award and Fellowships ==
Since 2007 the WZB grants the A.SK Award and Fellowships biannually: "The 100,000 Euro A.SK Social Science Award is one of the best-endowed awards in the social sciences. The endowment capital has been donated by the Chinese entrepreneurs Angela and Shu Kai Chan. The award recognizes outstanding contributions to social and political reform." In German media award and fellowships were compared with internationally recognized prizes, such as the Johan Skytte Prize and the Balzan Prize. In 2007 all laureates for the Award and Award Fellowships were nominated and chosen by a selection committee consisting of: Prof. Jutta Allmendinger, Prof. Werner Abelshauser, Prof. Stefano Bartolini, Prof. Lord Dahrendorf Prof. Peter Katzenstein and Prof. Kai A. Konrad. Since 2009 the WZB also publishes Calls for Nominations for the A.SK Fellowship. In 2015 the selection committee includes: Prof. Jutta Allmendinger, Prof. Werner Abelshauser, Prof. Kurt Biedenkopf, Prof. Dorothea Kübler, Prof. Orlando Patterson and Prof. Shalini Randeria. The A.SK Award and Fellowships are handed over in a public ceremony, honoring the laureates and including leading politicians or scholars as speakers, in Berlin. In 2009 the ceremony was part of the celebration of the 40th anniversary of the WZB with the German president Horst Köhler as one of the speakers. Since 2023, the A.SK Bright Mind Award has been awarded to promising young researchers, replacing the fellowships.

=== Recipients of the A.SK Social Science Award, A.SK Social Science Award Fellowships and the A.SK Bright Mind Award ===
2007

Sir Anthony Atkinson (Award)

Andreas Leutzsch

Felix Kolb

Janine Leschke

2009

Martha C. Nussbaum (Award)

Arolda Elbasani

Alexander Petring

Juan Fernandez

2011:

Transparency International (Award)

Yaman Kouli

Thamy Pogrebinschi

Martin Schröder

2013

Paul Collier (Award)

Daniel Tischer

Rami Zeedan

Olga Ulybina

Josef Hien

Theresa Reinold

2015

Esther Duflo (Award)

Robert Lepenies

Juliana Silva Goncalves

Mahnaz Zahirinejad Varnosfaderani

2017

John Ruggie (Award)

Philipp Hacker

Alexander Horn

2019

Raj Chetty

2021

James C. Scott

2023

Daron Acemoglu (A.SK Social Science Award)

Filiz Garip (A.SK Bright Mind Award)

Stefanie Stantcheva (A.SK Bright Mind Award)

2025

Pinelopi Koujianou Goldberg (A.SK Social Science Award)

Vicente Valentim (A.SK Bright Mind Award)

== People affiliated with WZB ==
- Ralf Dahrendorf
- Jürgen Kocka
- William H. Starbuck

== See also ==
- Berlin Graduate School for Transnational Studies
- List of universities, colleges, and research institutions in Berlin
- Hertie School of Governance
