= Mannheim Forum =

Interdisciplinary congress

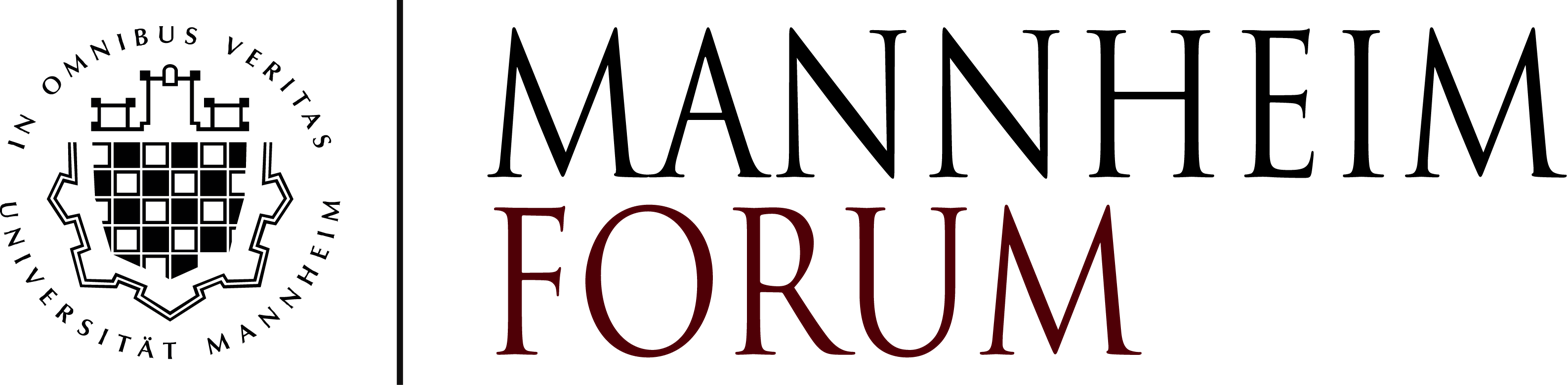
- Formation: 2012
- Type: Not-for-profit (NGO); Student society
- Legal status: Active
- Purpose: Discussion platform for contemporary topics
- Location: University of Mannheim, Mannheim, Germany
- Official language: English and German
- Volunteers: >50
- Website: mannheim-forum.org

The Mannheim Forum is an interdisciplinary congress organized exclusively by students of the University of Mannheim and, with more than 500 participants per year, is one of the largest universities conferences in Germany. During the Mannheim Forum, various events take place on the Mannheim main campus - the Mannheim Palace in Mannheim - giving participants the opportunity to discuss current topics with well-known personalities from politics, business and society. Besides the Mannheim forum offers different possibilities to develop faculty-spreading contacts and conduct Networking with different enterprises.

== History ==
In 2012, the Mannheim Forum student initiative was founded by the three largest student initiatives on the Mannheim campus: Arbeitskreis Börse (AKB), MTP - The Marketing Initiative and PoliMotion - The Politics Initiative. The idea and aim of the initiative was to establish an event that would enable participants and students from various disciplines to enter into a dynamic dialogue with representatives from diverse sectors of society on specific topics of future and current relevance. The first event organized by the initiative was the 2012 panel discussion between Mannheim professors from various disciplines and company representatives on the topic "EU - Economic Policy - Quo Vadis? The event was well received by both students and participants. The aim of the students from now on was to establish this event under the name "Mannheim Forum" as a permanent annual event at the University of Mannheim on a larger scale. In 2013 the first "Mannheim Forum" took place under the topic "Resources". Since then, the event has been held annually in spring and the eighth congress is scheduled under the Motto "VerAntwortung" (Responsibility - answers) for March 2020.

== Organization ==
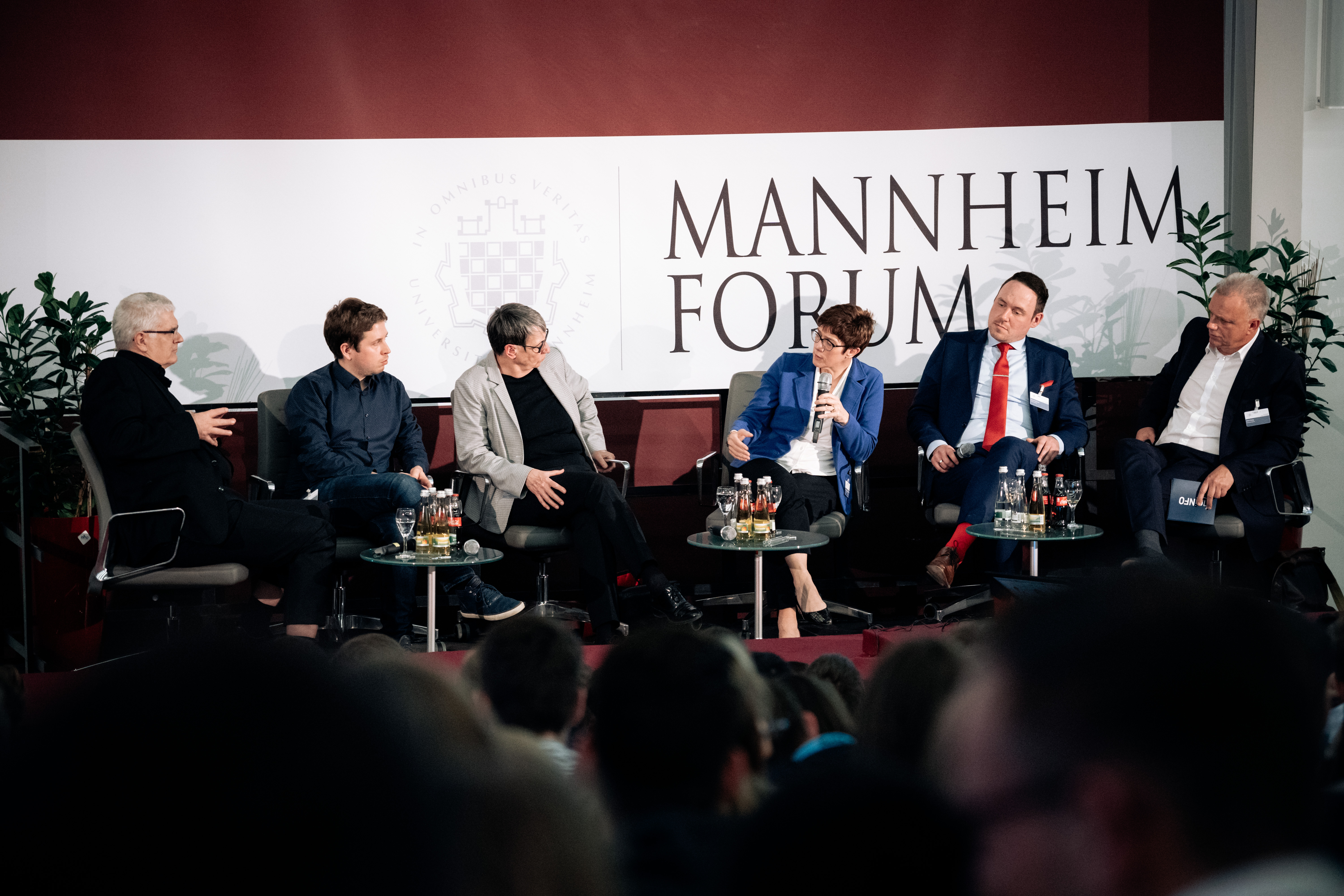
Panel Discussion at Mannheim Forum 2019 on Politics

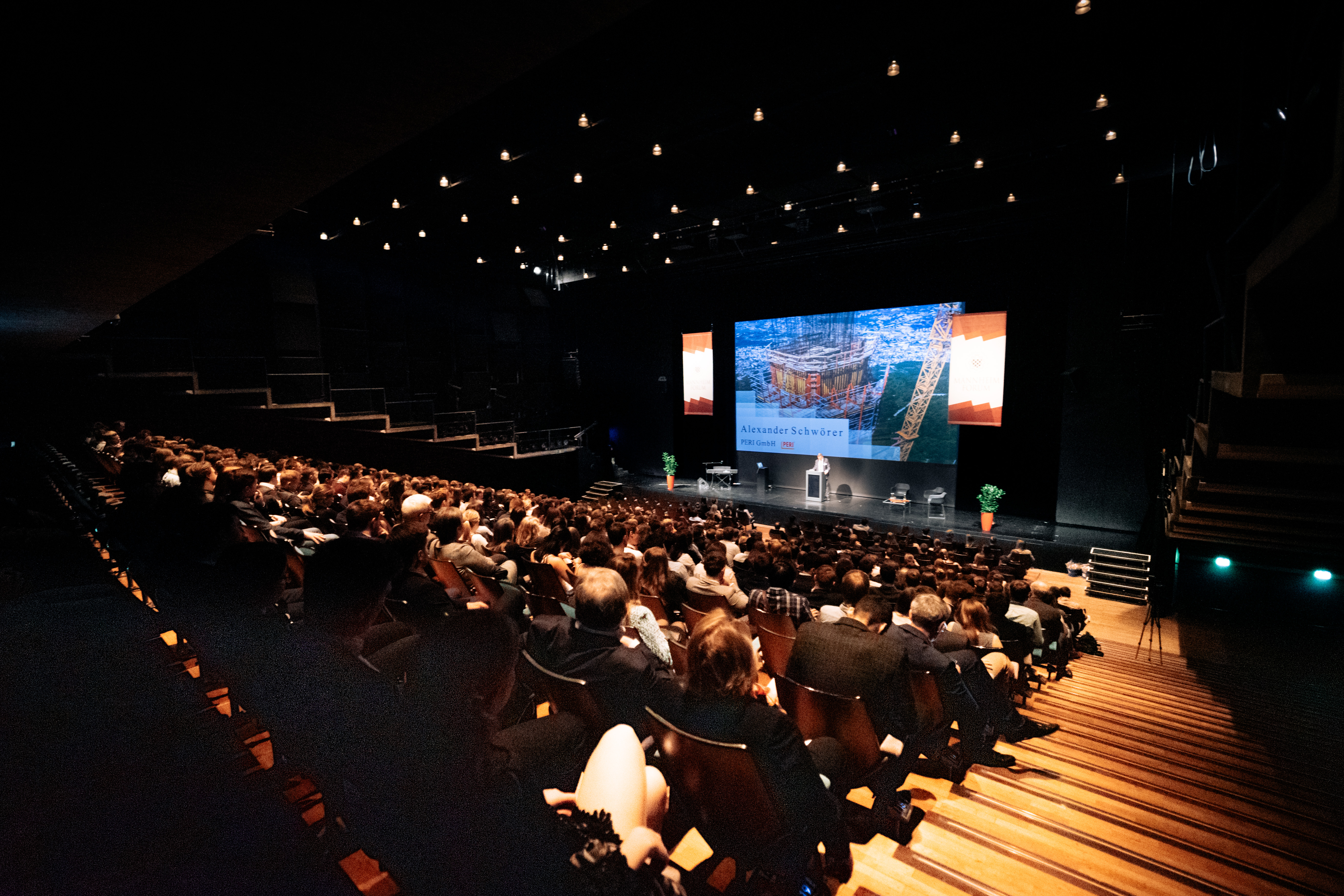
2019 Opening Ceremony in the National Theater of Mannheim

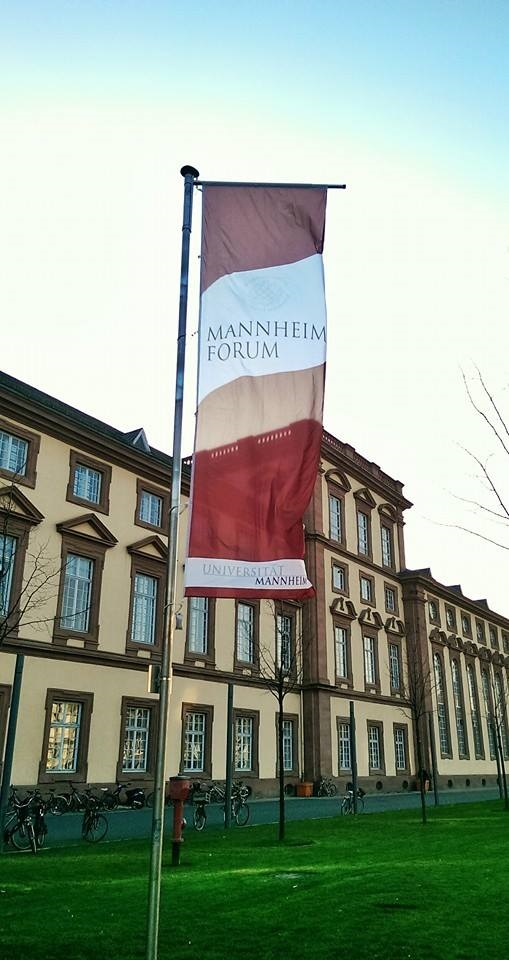
Mannheim Forum 2014 flag in front of the University of Mannheim

The Mannheim Forum is managed by the Mannheim Forum e.V. and is exclusively organized by students who study mainly at the University of Mannheim or at the Mannheim University of Applied Sciences. The majority of the members study in the second or fourth semester (at the time of the congress).

The congress is supported by external corporate partners (including SAP, Roland Berger, Reckitt Benckiser, Peri, Deloitte, Bertelsmann), the City of Mannheim and Startup Mannheim as well as the Mannheim Business School and the Mannheim Forum Alumni e.V. In addition, the Mannheim Forum works closely together with other student initiatives at the University of Mannheim, such as Infinity Mannheim, or POLImotion.

== The congress ==
The program of the Mannheim Forum can be divided into main events, workshops, networking events and supporting events.

=== Main events and workshops ===
Annually, the Mannheim Forum has a motto which is expressed in different perspectives. For example, the 2019 Congress addressed the theme of "reorientation" from the seven perspectives of business, politics, society, sport, IT, sustainability and entrepreneurship.

From these perspectives, main events with invited guests typically take place on Fridays and Saturdays, which are thematically specific. Also on these days, various workshops with experts and companies will be held.

=== Networking events ===
Likewise, different networking formats with the partner companies of the congress take place on Friday and Saturday, such as a career fair.

=== Supporting events ===
The congress typically begins on a Thursday evening with the opening event. In recent years, the opening event has been held outside the university in the Congress Centre Rosengarten or in the National Theatre of Mannheim.

Furthermore, the congresses of the past years consisted of a gala evening with dance on Friday and an after party in the city center of Mannheim on Saturday.

== Topics of former conferences ==
- 2019: neuOrientierung (Reorientation)
- 2018: Vernetzte Welten (Interconnected Worlds)
- 2017: Umbruch zum Aufbruch? (Transformation for Awakening?)
- 2016: (Ohne) Grenzen? ((Without) Borders?)
- 2015: ZeitFragen (Time Questions: Politics, Economy, Society and Science)
- 2014: Macht und Verteilung (Power - Who possess power? Is there a fair distribution of power in today's world?)
- 2013: Ressourcen und Nachhaltigkeit (Resources and Sustainability)
- 2012: EU - Wirtschaftspolitik - Quo Vadis? (EU - Economic Policy - Quo Vadis?)

== Selected speakers ==
In the past the Mannheim Forum was host to speakers from a broad range of fields, speakers included:

- Hamed Abdel-Samad
- Paul Achleitner
- Josef Ackermann
- Muhterem Aras
- Sabine Bendiek (CEO, Microsoft Germany)
- Christoph Biemann
- Peter Bofinger
- William Cohn
- Walter Gunz (Co-founder of Media Markt)
- Gregor Gysi
- Barbara Hendricks
- Gavin Hewitt
- Albrecht Hornbach (Chairman of Hornbach)
- Katja Kipping
- Annegret Kramp-Karrenbauer
- Kevin Kühnert
- Wolfgang Kubicki
- Norbert Lammert
- Harald Lesch
- Christian Lindner
- Frank Mattern (CEO, McKinsey & Co. Germany)
- Dirk Müller (German broker, known as "Mister Dax")
- Frank Plasberg
- Thomas Maria Renz
- Bernd Riexinger
- Bert Rürup
- Michael Schmidt-Salomon
- Peter Sloterdijk
- Peer Steinbrück
- Lencke Wischhusen
- Hans von Storch
- Sahra Wagenknecht
- Götz Werner
- Christian Wulff

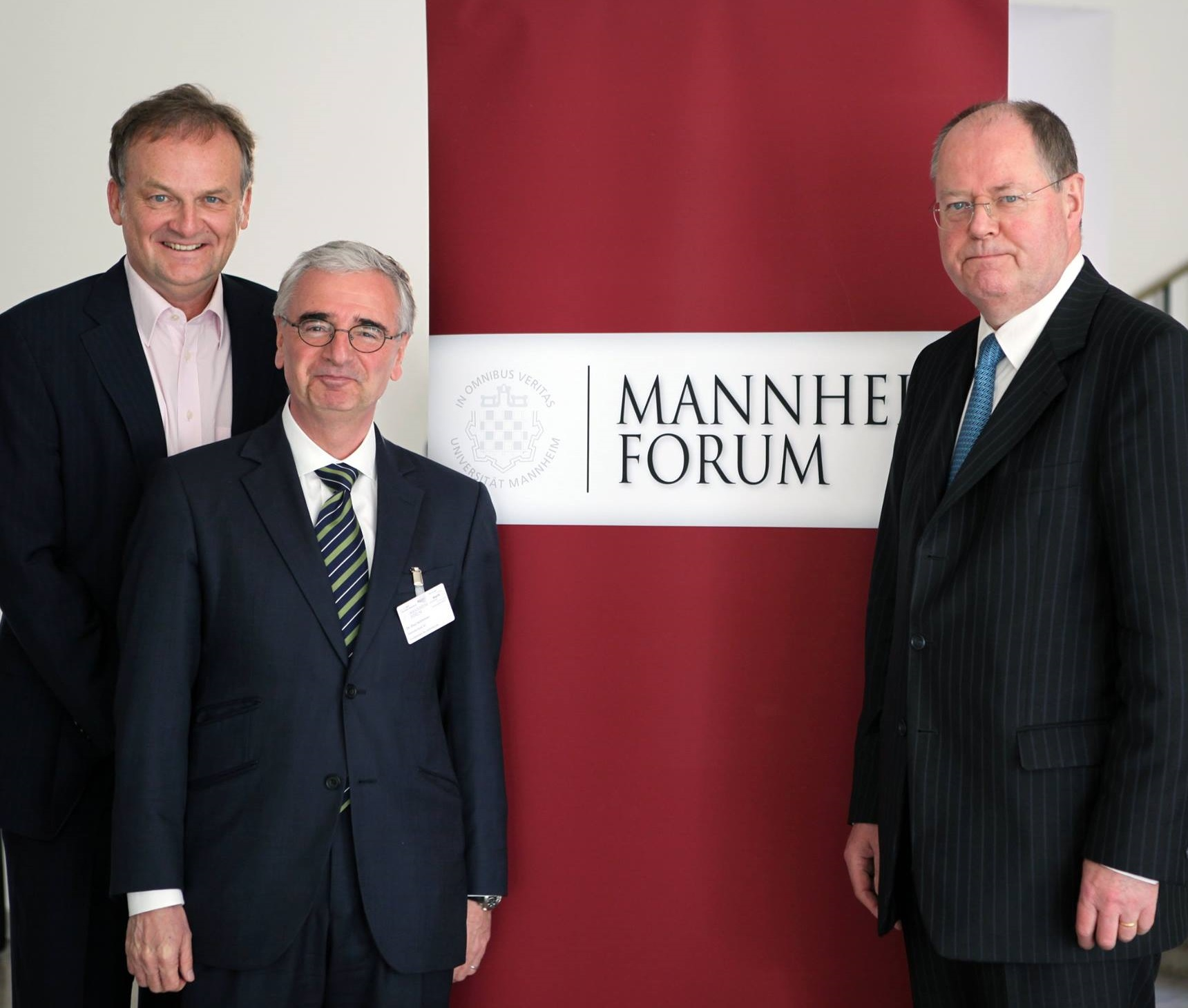
Frank Plasberg, Paul Achleitner and Peer Steinbrückon Mannheim Forum 2014

== See also ==
- EBS Symposium
- University of Mannheim
- Mannheim
- Mannheim Business School

== Reception ==
- Pflichtlektüre: Von Postkarten bis Daten sammeln: Wissen ist Macht, Online Article, March 14, 2014, Mannheim Forum 2014 Online
- MorgenWeb: Von Bankbeamten, Boni und billigem Wein, Online Article, March 15, 2014, Mannheim Forum 2014 Online
- Mannheimer Morgen: Mit den Chinesen wachsen, Online Article, March 15, 2014, Mannheim Forum 2014 Online
