= Arbeitskreis Börse =

German non-profit organisation

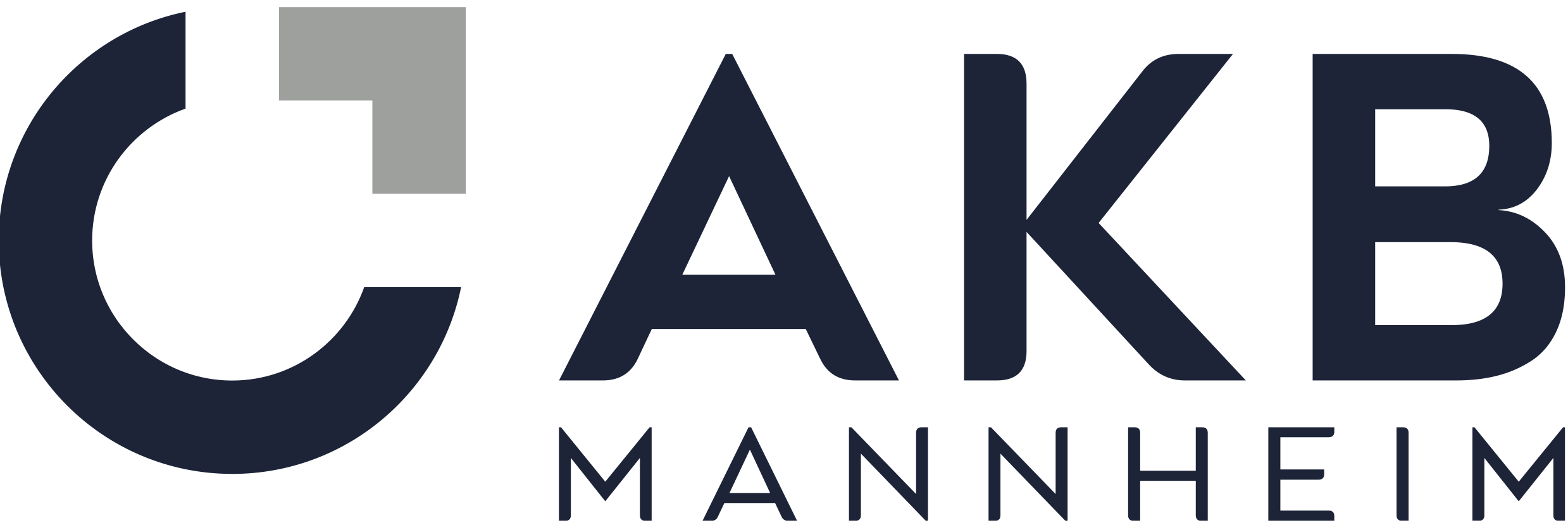
- Studenten der Universität Mannheim e.V.
- Formation: 06.11.1984
- Type: Not-for-profit (NGO); Student society
- Legal status: Active
- Purpose: Finance education
- Location: University of Mannheim, Mannheim, Germany
- Official language: German
- Volunteers: >1,500
- Website: akb-mannheim.de

The Arbeitskreis Börse (abbreviated AKB or AK Boerse) is a non-profit organization located in Mannheim (Germany), focused on investment banking, capital markets, consulting and start-up companies within the financial technology sector. It is the oldest financial association led by students in Germany and with over 1,500 members among the largest student organizations in Germany. The Arbeitskreis Börse is dedicated to connect students interested in financial markets associated with worldwide banks and consulting firms. These include Bank of America Merrill Lynch, EQT AB and McKinsey. It is organized first and foremost by students of the University of Mannheim but is receiving increasing support from students of other tertiary establishments in Mannheim.

== History ==
The Arbeitskreis Börse was founded in response to a perceived gap in the services provided by student societies at the University of Mannheim. Students interested in the stock exchange and financial markets, that sought to actively participate in capital markets did not have the opportunity to do so whilst engaging on campus as no such opportunity had yet been offered. Therefore, a small group of students independently organized an evening event within the university with the aim of creating a platform for students interested in the financial markets. Supported by the University this group developed into a non-profit association which was registered by the city of Mannheim on November 6, 1984.

Corresponding with positive developments within financial markets, membership within the Arbeitskreis Börse steadily grew to exceed 1,000 students within a few years. Through their stock market analysis and research papers, the Arbeitskreis Börse rapidly became well known throughout the Rhine-Neckar area, which led to global investment banks and consulting firms taking notice of the Arbeitskreis Börse. At the University of Mannheim the lecture series "Semester Program of the Arbeitskreis Börse" was established and the Arbeitskreis Börse focused on building partnerships with financial institutions within the European financial hubs, London and Frankfurt in the following years. To satisfy external requests the "Kreis der Freunde und Förderer des AKB" was founded in October 1988, an association that could be joined by everyone interested in the Arbeitskreis Börse.

Today the Arbeitskreis Börse is the largest finance association run by students in Germany and the largest student society at the University of Mannheim. The Arbeitskreis Börse still provides the same extensive semester program and within the framework of their lectures they attract renowned speakers from both the world's investment banks and consulting firms. While doing this the students of the University of Mannheim get the chance to develop business contacts at several networking events.

== Organization ==
As a student initiative, the Arbeitskreis Börse is mainly organized by students of the University of Mannheim in addition to several students from other tertiary establishments in Mannheim. In June, the Arbeitskreis Börse annually appoints its new leading team and executive board. The team is made up of the heads of five resorts: member management, event management, IT, marketing and social events. The executive board consists of five additional students who are responsible for resort management, finances, working groups, semester programme, special events, contacts to the university, developments of the Arbeitskreis Börse as an association, premium partners and other cooperation partners.

The Arbeitskreis Börse is supported by external partners, including Oliver Wyman, BCG, Bank of America Merrill Lynch, KPMG, PwC as well as the Mannheim Business School and alumni.

== Activities and semester program ==
The Arbeitskreis Börse attempts to form a direct link between the theoretical frameworks covered in academic studies and the practical application of these within a company. During each semester various events are organized on Mannheim's main campus - the Mannheim Palace in Mannheim, Baden-Württemberg, Germany. Firstly topical lectures are held by renowned individuals from within the financial or consulting industry, these have for instance included Armin von Falkenhayn, Head of Global Corporate and Investment Banking Germany at Bank of America Merrill Lynch; Dr. Marcus Schenk, Chief Financial Officer at Deutsche Bank: Christian Zorn, Head of Investment Banking Germany at Morgan Stanley and Frank Mattern, former CEO at McKinsey & Co. Occasionally representatives of other industries such as Kurt Bock, CEO at BASF SE, are invited to hold such lectures. Secondly, several company workshops as well as student work groups are conducted to support Mannheim students aspiring a career in the financial sector. Within these lectures, the various companies prepare case studies that provide insight into their structure and everyday work environment. Following these lectures, the audience is able to discuss specific topics with top tier personalities and get to know company recruiters as well as employees.

The companies that have held lectures or offered workshops during the past years in cooperation with the Arbeitskreis Börse are banks such as Bank of America Merrill Lynch banks such as Morgan Stanley, Goldman Sachs, JPMorgan, Credit Suisse, Commerzbank, Fidelity, Deutsche Bank, Barclays, Royal Bank of Scotland, Lazard, N M Rothschild & Sons, UBS, RBC Capital Markets, Leonardo & Co. and Jefferies, the central banks European Central Bank and Deutsche Bundesbank in addition to consulting firms such as Bain & Company, Boston Consulting Group, McKinsey & Co., Roland Berger Strategy Consultants, PricewaterhouseCoopers, L.E.K. Consulting, strategy&, KPMG and Oliver Wyman. Further cooperating companies are Ernst & Young, Perella Weinberg Partners, The Blackstone Group, 3I, Fresenius and BASF SE.

=== Lectures ===
In cooperation with several company partners the Arbeitskreis Börse organizes an extensive lecture series every semester, composed of up to 12 company presentations and technical lectures concerned with current topics from the financial community and industry. To do so, companies from the fields of investment banking, asset management, consulting and auditing are invited to create a thought provoking presentation that explores various points of view. The lectures demonstrate relationships between the latest case studies and theoretical foundations from academia as well as findings from their business applications. At the following get-together with snacks and drinks students have the opportunity to get in personal contact with the speakers, to discuss specialist topics and ask questions regarding internships and career options.

=== Workshops ===
Similar to this, the Arbeitskreis Börse, in cooperation with company partners organises numerous workshops every semester. Case studies offer a rare opportunity to gain better insight into specific business divisions and to analyse complex business matters. After the presentation of results, students come into contact with employees and are able ask specific questions and acquire information about a potential career within these companies. Getting to know preferences and strengths during the workshops makes it easier for a single business division or a certain enterprise to make a decision.

=== Working groups ===
Another task of the Arbeitskreis Börse is to transmit knowledge in Excel and Bloomberg and to encourage active discussions with problems from the area of finance industry and management consultancy. Students can meet weekly to acquire and deepen fundamental knowledge in the respective subject areas under instruction from experienced Alumni to be optimally prepared for internships and entry into the workforce. To advanced students, a platform to discuss highly demanding problems is offered. The knowledge acquired in the working groups is indispensable for future entry into financial business.

=== Social events ===
During each semester, numerous social events take place, which promote cohesion among members and help familiarise students with recently joined fellow students as well provide a temporary escape from stressful university life. Thus the students become part of a large community that outlasts their time at university and allows Alumni to return to Mannheim annually.

== Selected topics of past lectures ==
=== 2022 ===
- May 2022: Insights into VC (Visionaries Club)
- March 2022: How to break into Private Equity (PER)
- October 2022: Insight Consulting (Bain & Company)
- March 2022: Virtual look into financial advisory (Lazard)

=== 2021 ===
- April 2021: PE in Covid (EQT)
- May 2021: Digital business building (McKinsey & Company)
- October 2021: Company presentation (Bank of America Merrill Lynch)
- October 2021: Ein Tag als Restrukturierungsberater/in (FTI Andersch)

=== 2020 ===
- November 2020: Company presentation (Barclays)
- October 2020: Zukunft von Banken (Deutsche Bank)
- October 2020: Autonomous driving (Bain & Company)
- September 2020: Virtual Networking (PJT Partners)

=== 2019 ===
- May 2019: Artificial intelligence (Bain & Company)

=== 2016 ===
- November 2016: The Future of Banking – the shape of things to come (Oliver Wyman)
- September 2016: Bainlecture - an introduction in the private equity industry, current challenges, and key takeaways (Bain & Company)
- September 2016: Mobile Banking of the Future (Deutsche Bank)
- May 2016: The Future of Banking (PricewaterhouseCoopers)

=== 2015 ===
- November 2015: Regulation of domestic markets: overview of current developments and influences of the regulation of banking business concepts (Bain & Company)
- November 2015: Monetary policy of the European Central Bank during banking and financial crisis (European Central Bank)
- October 2015: Stakeholder-Management as a success factor for financial restructuring (KPMG)
- September 2015: Panel discussion: Structural changes in financial industries (Deutsche Bank)
- March 2015: Caution vs. Vision - German medium-sized businesses: Quo vadis? (Commerzbank)
- March 2015: Strategy through Execution - An integrated Consulting Offering (PricewaterhouseCoopers)
- March 2015: Price stability: Making sure it does happen in the euro area (European Central Bank)

=== 2014 ===
- November 2014: Retail Bank of the Future (Bain & Company)
- November 2014: INDUSTRY 4.0 – The new industrial revolution (Roland Berger Strategy Consultants)
- October 2014: "The right Exit": The Strategist`s view on M&A in turbulent times (Boston Consulting Group)
- April 2014: Success factors with Mergers & Acquisitions from the perspective of BASF (Kurt Bock, BASF SE)
- March 2014: Fiscal Politics during the Financial Crisis of 2008 (Deutsche Bundesbank)

=== 2013 ===
- October 2013: The New Normal for Banking in Europe: Green Shoots, Higher Rates and Greater Regulation (Bank of America Merrill Lynch)
- September 2013: ECM: IPO of Equant (Morgan Stanley)
- September 2013: Daimler/ EADS Accelerated Buyout (Goldman Sachs)
- September 2013: 8 Billion Business Opportunities – Economic prospects of population growth (Roland Berger Strategy Consultants)
- March 2013: Theory meets practice: business valuation at the example of Volkswagen AG (PricewaterhouseCoopers)

=== 2012 ===
- October 2012: European Banking Industry - 4 Years After Lehman, Where Do We Go From Here? (Bank of America Merrill Lynch)
- October 2012: IPO 2.0 - Introduction to an IPO Process and Recent Changes (Morgan Stanley)
- September 2012: No strategy, no turnaround (BCG)
- April 2012: Opportunities in Sub-Saharan Africa – Perspectives of an Early Mover (Roland Berger Strategy Consultants)
- March 2012: Adjustments to climate change (McKinsey & Company)

=== 2011 ===
- October 2011: VW/Porsche: Dissecting Complexity (Morgan Stanley)
- September 2011: Enabling a strong risk culture in banking (Boston Consulting Group)
- May 2011: "Residential Mortgage backed Securities" (Royal Bank of Scotland)
- March 2011: "Winning in a volatile world." (McKinsey & Co.)
- March 2011: "Complex Business Problems" (former Booz & Company, today Strategy&)
- March 2011: "Are today's loan markets foreseeing a change?" (Jefferies)

=== 2010 ===
- November 2010: Commercial Due Diligence in Private Equity - How to identify the good deals (Bain & Company)
- October 2010: "Project Victoria": Negotiating LBO terms during the Credit Crunch (N M Rothschild & Sons)
- October 2010: Implications of the financial crisis on corporate finance services and recent developments (Credit Suisse)
- September 2010: Accelerating out of the great recession (Boston Consulting Group)

== Selected topics of past workshops ==
=== 2023 ===
- March 2023: Merger Modeling (Royal Bank of Canada)

=== 2022 ===
- October 2022: Beer, Buy and Build (Waterland)
- May 2022: How an early-stage *Venture Capital* thinks and makes investment decisions (Picus Capital)
- May 2022: Private Debt (Strategy&)
- October 2022: (J.P.Morgan)

=== 2021 ===
- April 2021: Rise im Ferkelstall (FTI Andersch)
- April 2021: Case (Strategy&)
- October 2021: Private Equity (Waterland)
- November 2021: M&A Workshop (Royal Bank of Canada)

=== 2020 ===
- October 2020: Acquisition of tiffany&co (Bloomberg)
- March 2020: 3D Mobility (Stern Stewart)
- May 2020: Marketing Game (Boston Consulting Group)
- November 2020: Trading Game (Citi-Group)

=== 2019 ===
- March 2019: Artificial Intelligence in banking (Bain & Company)
- May 2019: Green finance (HSBC)
- October 2019: What will you create? (Morgan Stanley)
- November 2019: Climate change (Oliver Wyman)

=== 2018 ===
- October 2018: Asset management (BlackRock)

=== 2017 ===
- October 2017: Capital markets (Citi-Group)

=== 2016 ===
- May 2016: Negotiation (strategy&)
- April 2016: Value Enhancement (Droege Group)
- April 2016: Excel Workshop (KPMG
- April 2016: Interview-Training (Boston Consulting Group)
- March 2016: M&A-Workshop (Lazard)

=== 2015 ===
- November 2015: IPO - the art of going public: From kick-off to ringing the bell (Commerzbank)
- October 2015: Interview-Training (McKinsey & Co.)
- October 2015: Corporate Finance (UBS)
- September 2015: Share Economy (Boston Consulting Group)
- April 2015: Business valuation, bidding and negotiation in a real-life M&A transaction (Leonardo & Co.)
- April 2015: Take on the Challenge of Investment Banking (Jefferies)
- March 2015: Success factor: project management (Bain & Company)

=== 2014 ===
- November 2014: The Future of European Banking (Oliver Wyman)
- October 2014: Trading Game (Royal Bank of Scotland)
- October 2014: Women in Banking (Goldman Sachs)
- October 2014: Change the game for a food company's activities in Africa (Boston Consulting Group)
- October 2014: Simulation of a Competitive Auction Process (Perella Weinberg Partners)
- April 2014: Wargaming (Roland Berger Strategy Consultants)
- April 2014: Stock Picking 3.0: A practical guide to success with stocks + derivatives (Bank of America Merrill Lynch)
- March 2014: Private Equity M&A: Actual Challenges in Modelling LBO Transactions (Blackstone)

=== 2013 ===
- November 2013: Business valuation, bidding and negotiation in a real-life M&A transaction (Leonardo & Co.)
- November 2013: Live Trading Simulation (Royal Bank of Scotland)
- October 2013: Develop a Potential Strategic Response to the Structural Reforms of the Banking Sector (Oliver Wyman)
- April 2013: Equities Sales & Trading (Bank of America Merrill Lynch)
- April 2013: Strategic transaction consulting for private equity investors und industrial companies (L.E.K. Consulting)

=== 2012 ===
- October 2012: A day in life of an investment banker: Mergers & Acquisitions case study (N M Rothschild & Sons)
- October 2012: Pimp your product! (Roland Berger Strategy Consultants)
- March 2012: Success by vitamin B (relationships) – Networking and Relationship Building (former booz&co., strategy&)

=== 2011 ===
- May 2011: Discover the world of precious metals (Oliver Wyman)
- May 2011: "Consulting is a role, not a job." (McKinsey & Company)

== See also ==
- University of Mannheim
- Mannheim Business School
