= Christian Homburg =

German marketing researcher

- Born: 13 January 1962 (age 64); Gomadingen, West Germany
- Education: University of Mainz; Karlsruhe Institute of Technology
- Scientific career
- Fields: Business Administration, Marketing, Behavioral Sciences
- Workplaces: University of Mannheim

Christian Homburg (born 1962 in Gomadingen, Baden-Württemberg, West Germany) is a German marketing researcher, director of the IMU – Institute for Market-oriented Management and chaired professor for Marketing at the University of Mannheim. His special subjects are market-oriented management, customer relationship management and sales management. Furthermore, from 2006 until the 2010, Homburg was the exclusive managing director of the Mannheim Business School. In addition to his academic position, he is chairman of the scientific advisory committee of Homburg & Partner, an international management consultancy firm.

== Biography ==
Homburg was born in Gomadingen, Germany in 1962. He studied business administration, economics and mathematics at the Karlsruhe Institute of Technology ("KIT", formerly known as Technical University of Karlsruhe) and completed his master's degree in 1986. He received his doctorate (Ph.D) in 1988 and habilitated at the University of Mainz in 1995. Prior to his academic career Homburg was director of marketing, controlling and strategic planning at KSB AG.

Homburg has published numerous books and articles at both national and international level. He is member of the editorial boards of six scientific journals in the United States and Germany. Since April 2011 he operates as the first German area editor for the Journal of Marketing. Homburg received several awards for his scientific research from the American Marketing Association.

From the December 2006 until November 2010, Homburg was managing director of the Mannheim Business School.

== Honours ==
In March 2006, the Copenhagen Business School awarded Homburg the honorary doctor and in July 2008 he received his second honorary doctor from the Freiberg University of Mining and Technology. Since the end of 2007 he is Professorial Fellow at the Department of Management and Marketing at the University of Melbourne.

== Personal life ==
He is married to Larisa Homburg and has four children.

== Publications ==
- Ch. Homburg, A. Hahn, O. Jensen (2012), How to Organize Pricing? Vertical Delegation and Horizontal Dispersion of Pricing Authority. Journal of Marketing, forthcoming.
- Ch. Homburg, M. Artz, J. Wieseke (2012), Marketing Performance Measurement Systems: Does Comprehensiveness Really Improve Performance?, Journal of Marketing, 76, 3, 56-77.
- Ch. Homburg, M. Klarmann, S. Staritz (2012), Downsizing at the Interface with the Customer: The Role of Customer Uncertainty and Downsizing Communication, Journal of Marketing, 76, 3, 112-130.
- Ch. Homburg, M. Klarmann, M. Müller (2011), When Should the Customer Really Be King? On the Optimum Level of Salesperson Customer Orientation in Sales Encounters, Journal of Marketing, 75, 2, 55-74.
- Ch. Homburg, V. Steiner, D. Totzek (2009), Managing Dynamics in a Customer Portfolio, Journal of Marketing, 73, 5, 70-89.
- Ch. Homburg, J. Wieseke, T. Bornemann (2009), Implementing the Marketing Concept at the Employee - Customer Interface: The Role of Customer Need Knowledge, Journal of Marketing, 73, 4, 64-81.
- Ch. Homburg, J. Wieseke, W. D. Hoyer (2009), Social Identity and the Service - Profit Chain, Journal of Marketing, 73, 3, 38-54.
- Ch. Homburg, M. Droll, D. Totzek (2008), Customer Prioritization: Does It Pay Off and How Should It Be Implemented?, Journal of Marketing, 72, 5, 110-130.
- Ch. Homburg, O. Jensen, & H. Krohmer (2008), Configurations of Marketing and Sales: A Taxonomy, Journal of Marketing, 72, 2, 133-154.
- Ch. Homburg, M. Grozdanovic, M. Klarmann, (2007), Responsiveness to Customers and Competitors: The Role of Affective and Cognitive Organizational Systems, Journal of Marketing, 71, 3, 18–38.
- X. Luo, Ch. Homburg, (2007), Neglected Outcomes of Customer Satisfaction, Journal of Marketing, 71, 2, 133-149.
- Ch. Homburg, O. Jensen (2007), The Thought Worlds of Marketing & Sales: Which Differences Make a Difference?, Journal of Marketing, 71, 3, 124-142.
- Ch. Homburg, N. Koschate, W. Hoyer (2006), The Role of Cognition and Affect in the Formation of Customer Satisfaction – A Dynamic Perspective, Journal of Marketing, 70, 3, 21-31.
- Ch. Homburg, A. Fürst (2005), How Organizational Complaint Handling Drives Customer Loyalty: An Analysis of the Mechanistic and the Organic Approach, Journal of Marketing, 69, 3, 95-114.
- Ch. Homburg, N. Koschate, W. D. Hoyer (2005), Do Satisfied Customers Really Pay More? A Study of the Relationship between Customer Satisfaction and Willingness to Pay, Journal of Marketing, 69, 2, 84-96.
- Ch. Homburg, W. D. Hoyer, M. Fassnacht (2002), Service Orientation of a Retailer's Business Strategy: Dimensions, Antecedents and Performance Outcomes, Journal of Marketing, 66, 4, 86-101.
- Ch. Homburg, J.P. Workman, O. Jensen (2002), A Configurational Perspective on Key Account Management, Journal of Marketing, 66, 2, 38-61.
- J. Cannon, Ch. Homburg (2001), Buyer - Supplier Relationships and Customer Firm Costs, Journal of Marketing, 65, 1, 29-43.
- S. Kuester, Ch. Homburg, T. Robertson (1999), Retaliatory Behavior to New Product Entry, Journal of Marketing, 63, 4, 90-106.
- Ch. Homburg, J. P. Workman, H. Krohmer (1999), Marketing's Influence Within the Firm, Journal of Marketing, 63, 2, 1-17.
