= Paulo Morgado =

Portuguese manager and writer (born 1963)

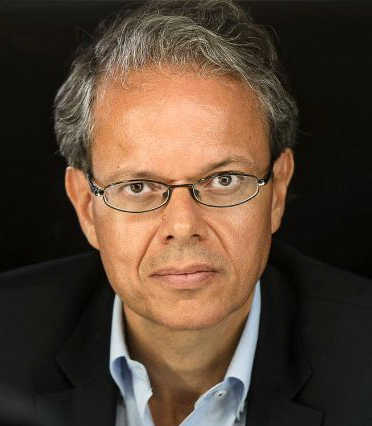
- Born: Paulo José Ferreira Morgado; 10 October 1963 (age 62); Portugal
- Occupations: Manager, writer Curriculum Vitae

Paulo José Ferreira Morgado (born 10 October 1963, in Leiria, Portugal) is a Portuguese manager and writer. He has been living in Madrid (Spain) since 2014, year where he became CEO of Capgemini in Spain. He is currently Executive Vice-President of Capgemini Group.

== Biography ==
Born on 10 October 1963, Paulo Morgado moved to Lisbon in the early 1980s where he completed his degree in business administration at Católica Lisbon School of Business & Economics.

He is currently a Partner of TwinPikes, after being Executive Vice-President of Capgemini Group. Between July 2014 to March 2018, he was the chief executive officer (CEO) of Capgemini Spain, following his role as CEO of Capgemini Portugal (which he joined in 2001 as vice-president of the Strategic Consulting unit), for which he was appointed in 2003.

He started his professional career as a strategy consultant for Roland Berger Strategy Consultants and he subsequently worked in the corporate finance department of Banco Finantia. In 1995, with only 32 years of age, he became the CEO of Vidago, Melgaço & Pedras Salgadas, a listed company.

He has an extensive academic curriculum, and apart from his classic degree in management from Católica Lisbon School of Business & Economics, he has also completed a Master's in Finance at Lovaina Catholic University and a classic degree in law at Universidade Lusíada, graduating as the best student in both courses. In 2011, he has obtained the degree of Master in Philosophy of Language from Lisbon Catholic University, with the highest grade summa cum laude.

He is also Doctor in Business Administration from Nottingham Trent University.

His studies in business administration and management sciences are a personal pursuit. In addition to his academic career and professional career, Morgado is also an accredited author in a broad variety of fields such as negotiation, argumentation, financial crime prevention and, most recently, language and management logic, having published 7 books with some of the most prestigious international and national publishers.

Paulo Morgado works on a regular basis with business schools such as Deusto Business School, ESADE Business & Law School, IE Business School and Porto Business School.

He has had a blog called Encuentros de Alta Dirección since July 2016, in which he summarizes and comments on business administration and strategy matters addressed at events aimed specifically at senior management, as well as other professional and topical issues.

== Published books ==
- 2017, Strategy in Action (strategy and management)
- 2016, Gerrir (management)
- 2012, FAZER (execution)
- 2011, O Riso em Bergson (logic and language)
- 2011, Transparência, Justiça e Liberdade – Em Memória de Saldanha Sanches (coauthored)
- 2010, Portugal – E Agora? Que Fazer? (coauthored)
- 2007, O Corrupto e o Diabo (corruption)
- 2005, Contos de Colarinho Branco (financial crime)
- 2003, Cem Argumentos (argumentation)
- 1994, O Processo Negocial (negotiation)
