= Grafeneck =

- Village of Gomadingen
- Interactive map of Grafeneck
- Location within Germany Location within Baden-Württemberg
- Coordinates: 48°23′40″N 9°25′57″E
- Country: Germany
- State: Baden-Württemberg
- District: Reutlingen
- Municipality: Gomadingen
- Time zone: UTC+01:00 (CET)
  - Summer (DST): UTC+02:00 (CEST)

Grafeneck is a small rural village in the German municipality of Gomadingen, south of Stuttgart.

== World War II history ==
Grafeneck Castle, which had previously been an asylum for crippled people, was turned by the Nazis into an extermination facility.

Between January and December 1940, 10,654 people with mental disabilities or psychological disorders were gassed at this facility with carbon monoxide in the first gas chamber and then cremated. This was the beginning of the T-4 Euthanasia Program. Grafeneck was the first Nazi institution to be transformed in a gas chamber and crematorium.
