= Grafeneck killing centre =

Killing centre used in Nazi Germany

- NS-Tötungsanstalt Grafeneck
- Near Grafeneck in Germany
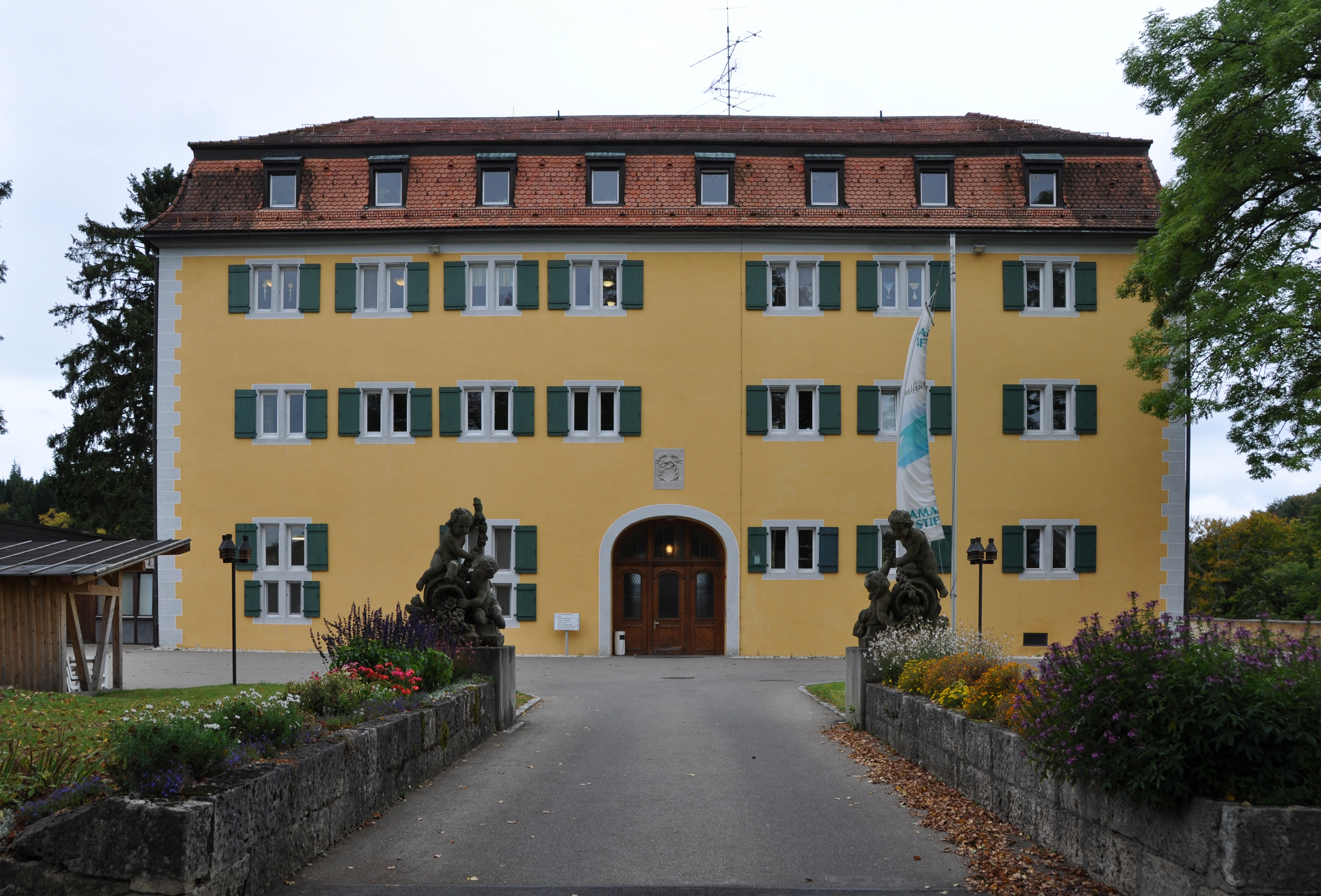
- Front view of Grafeneck Castle

Site information
- Open to the public: Yes
- Website: gedenkstaette-grafeneck.de

Location
- Location within Baden-Württemberg Location within Germany
- Coordinates: 48°23′33″N 9°25′45″E

Site history
- Built: 1560

Garrison information
- Occupants: Samaritan Foundation

The Grafeneck killing centre (German: NS-Tötungsanstalt Grafeneck) housed in Grafeneck Castle was one of Nazi Germany's extermination centres as part of their forced euthanasia programme, Action T4. Today, it is a memorial site dedicated to the victims of the state-authorised programme. At least 10,500 mentally and physically disabled people, predominantly from Bavaria and Baden-Württemberg, were killed there during 1940. It was one of the first places in Nazi Germany where people were killed in large numbers in a gas chamber using carbon monoxide. This was the beginning of the Nazi killing of the ill and disabled. Grafeneck was also the central office of the "Charitable Ambulance Transport GmbH" (Gekrat), which was headed by Reinhold Vorberg and responsible for the transport of T4.

== Location ==
Grafeneck is a castle-like property in Grafeneck, a part of the municipality of Gomadingen in Baden-Württemberg.

== History ==
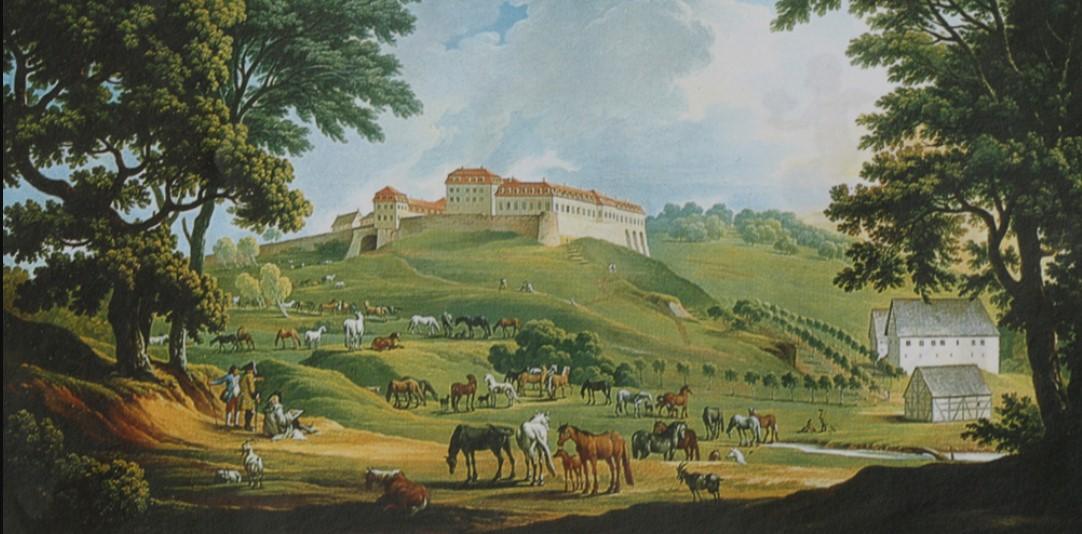
Grafeneck castle with the rococo palace of duke Charles Eugene in front of it, in 1780

Built around 1560, the Grafeneck Castle served as a hunting lodge for the Dukes of Württemberg. During the 18th century, Charles Eugene, Duke of Württemberg created a large Rococo palace in front of the castle, but this palace has now been lost as it is demolished. In the 19th century, it was used by the Forest Service. The Samaritan Foundation charity acquired it in 1928, and established an asylum for disabled people in the following year. On 13 October 1939, Richard Alber, Landrat of administrative district Münsingen from 1938 to 1944, ordered that Schloss Grafeneck had to be cleared the next day. Four buses evacuated around 100 disabled men and a few women from Grafeneck, as well as 12 employees, to the St. Elizabeth Monastery in Reute. All of these evacuated patients survived Aktion T4.

== Modification of the building ==
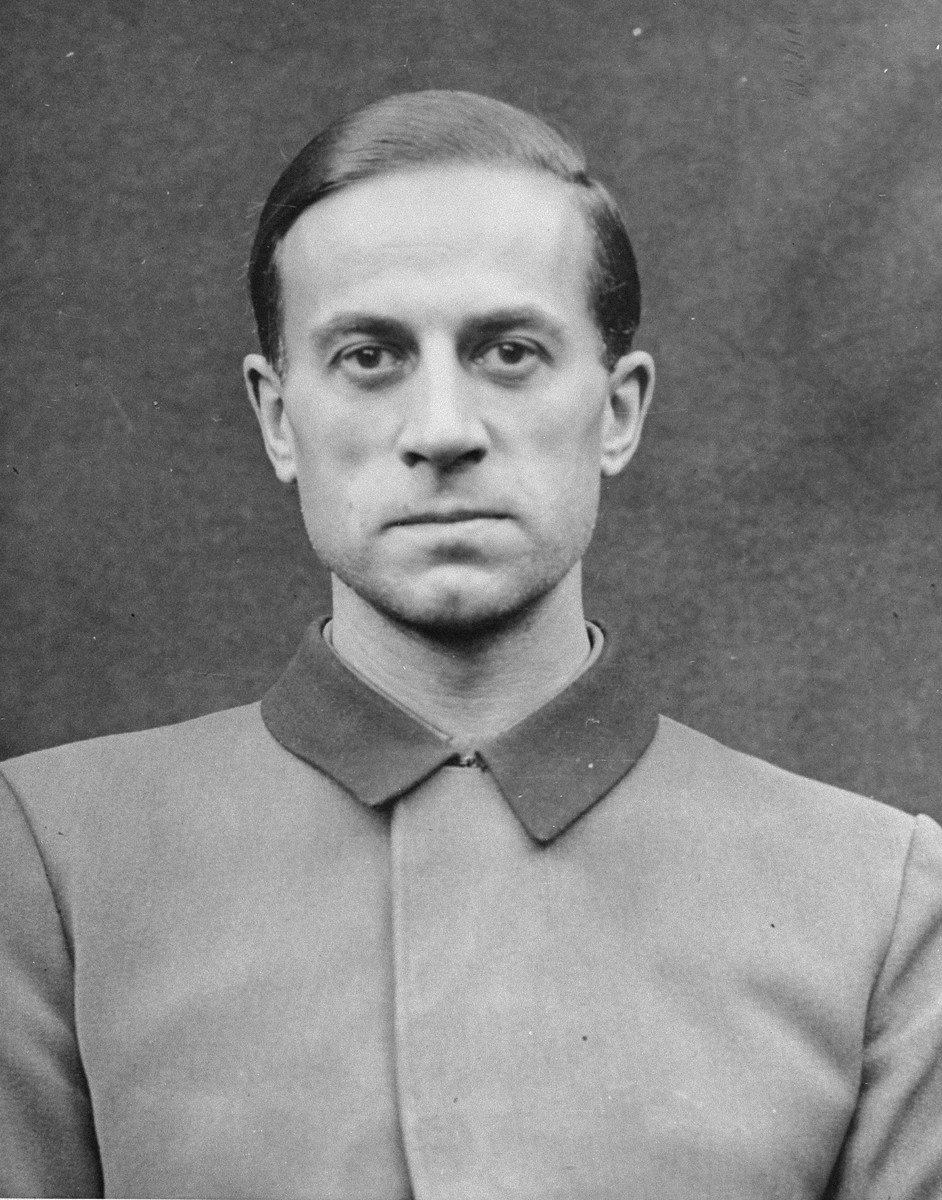
Karl Brandt, Hitler's personal physician and organiser of Action T4

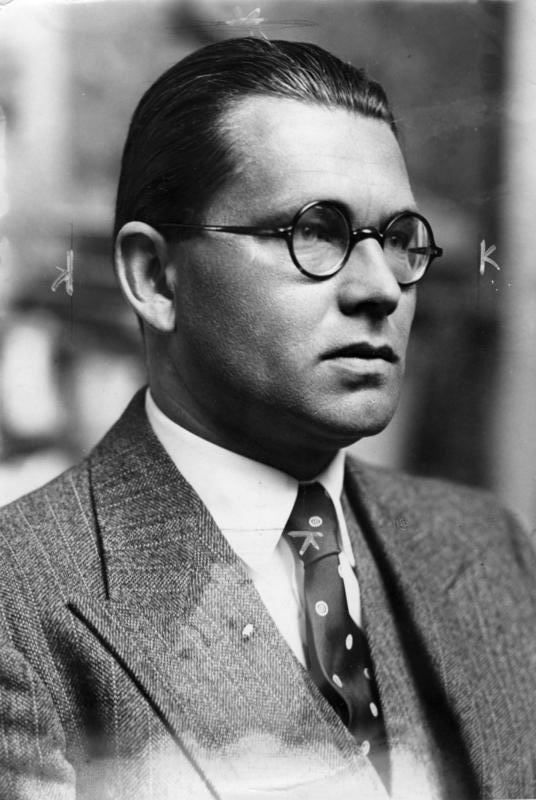
Philipp Bouhler, head of the T4 programme

From October 1939 to January 1940 the former Samaritan Hospital was rebuilt into a killing area. Living and administration rooms were installed in the castle, as well as a registry office and a police office. In the castle grounds were built a wooden hut with about 100 beds, a parking space for the grey buses, a crematorium oven and a shed with facilities for gassing people. Moreover, staff were recruited from Stuttgart and Berlin: doctors, police officers, clerks, maintenance and transport personnel, economic and domestic staff, guards and funeral staff. Between October and December 1939, only 10 to 20 people were in the castle, but by 1940 there were about 100 staff.

Systematic murder under Action T4 started on 18 January 1940 in Grafeneck in a gas chamber camouflaged as a shower room, which was in a garage. The prison doctor operated a manometer valve to allow carbon monoxide to enter the gas chamber. The steel cylinders required were supplied by Mannesmann; the gas was made by IG Farben in Ludwigshafen (BASF). The first murdered patients were from the mental hospital Eglfing-Haar in Bavaria. The victims came from 48 institutions for the handicapped and mentally ill: 40 from almost all districts of Baden-Württemberg, six from Bavaria and one each from Hesse and North Rhine-Westphalia.

Killings with gas were performed between January and December 1940. On 13 December 1940 the last victims were burned in the crematory. Afterwards, Grafeneck was used to house children and mothers with babies who had fled from Allied bombing. 10,654 disabled and sick people were killed in Grafeneck Castle through lethal injections and gas. The French occupying forces returned the site in 1946/47 to the Samaritan Foundation or Samariterstiftung, who re-established it as a centre for disabled and mentally ill people, which still operates. In the 1950s, the development of the cemetery began as a memorial. In 2005, the documentation centre Grafeneck Memorial was built.

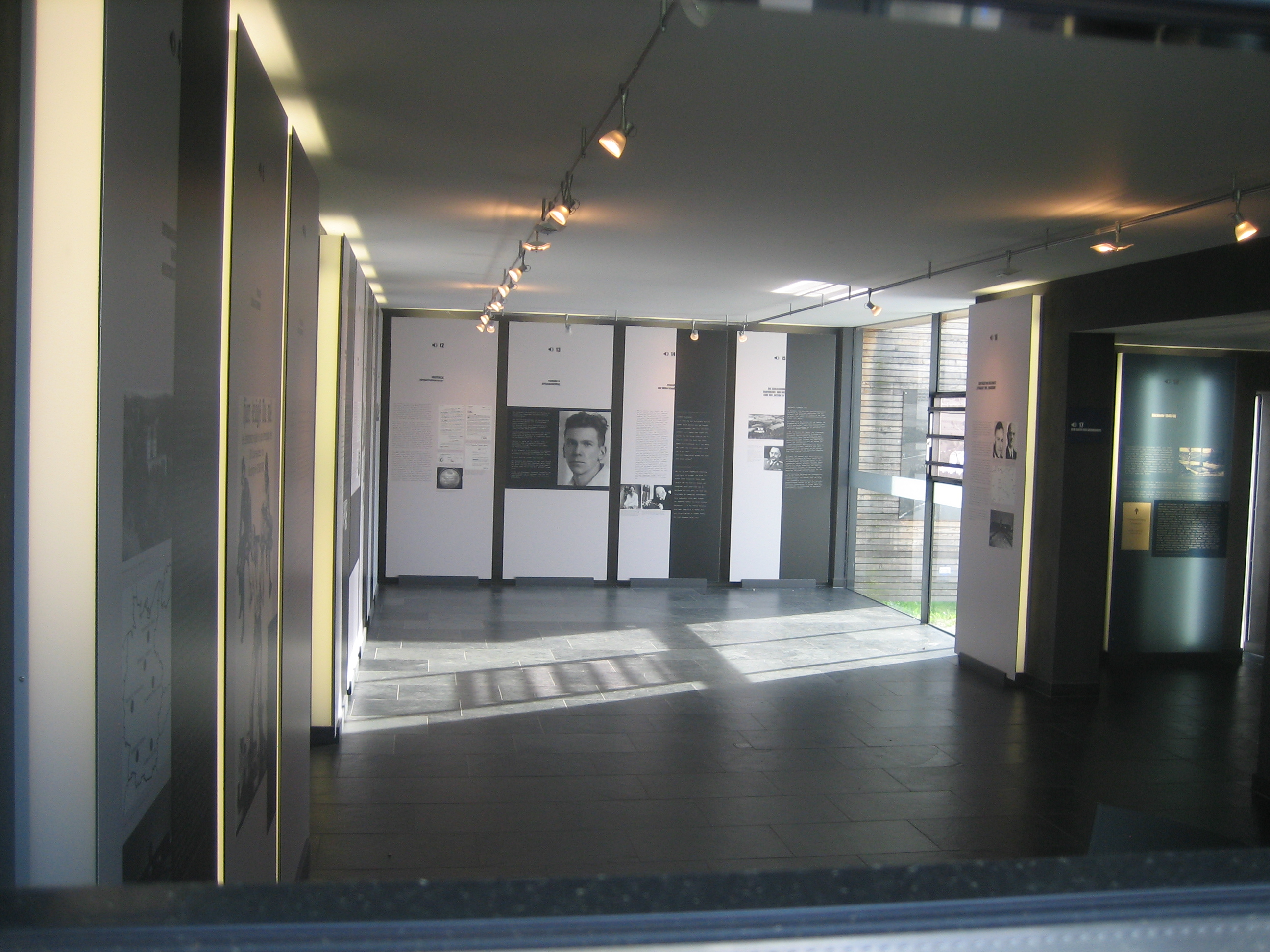
Grafeneck Documentation Centre and Museum

== Offenders ==
Some Grafeneck staff later held important positions in the Nazi concentration camps.

=== Administration ===
- Ludwig Sprauer, (1884-1962), highest medical officer of Baden, responsible for implementation of "Euthanasie-Programm" in Baden.
- Otto Mauthe, (1892-1974), highest medical officer of Württemberg, responsible for "Euthanasie"-administration in Württemberg.
- Eugen Stähle, (1890-1948), medical officer in the Württemberg ministry of the interior.

=== Doctors ===
The T4-organisators Viktor Brack and Karl Brandt arranged that the killing of ill people was to be made only by medical staff, according to a letter from Adolf Hitler (1. September). Operating the gas tap was the task of the doctors. However, the gas tap was operated by non-medical staff when the doctors were not present or for other reasons. Grafeneck doctors were referred to in correspondence using code names, shown here in quotation marks.

- Head, "medical director": Horst Schumann (1906-1983), ("Dr Klein"), from January 1940 to the end of May/beginning of June 1940. Afterward worked at Sonnenstein Euthanasia Centre and as a camp doctor in Auschwitz-Birkenau.
- Deputy: Ernst Tree Hard (1911-1943) ("Dr Hunter"): from January 1940 to April 1940. From December 1940 to June 1941 held the same position in the Hadamar Euthanasia Centre.
- Deputy: Günther Hennecke (1912-1943) ("Dr Fleck"), from 25 April 1940 to December 1940. Afterward held the same position in the Hadamar Euthanasia Centre.

=== Management and other personnel ===
- "Office manager": Christian Wirth, the most important non-medical director of the killing center, responsible for security; the Special Registry Office Grafeneck; forging the official death certificates; the staff; and supervising murder operations.
- Deputy "office manager": Gerhard Kurt Simon ("Dr. Ott", "wedge"); Drawing as a "registrar" ("anger") .
- First director of the Special Registry Office Grafeneck: Jakob Wöger ("Haase"), from December 1939 to June 1940.
- Deputy Head of the Special Registry Office: Hermann Holzschuh, according to Wögers leaving his successor ("Lemm")
- "Burner": Josef Oberhauser, responsible for burning bodies in the specially installed cremators.
- "Transport manager": Hermann Schwenninger, headed the transport squadron of "Gekrat", which brought the victims to Grafeneck.

== Literature ==
- Susanne C. Knittel, The Historical Uncanny: Disability, Ethnicity, and the Politics of Holocaust Memory, (New York: Fordham University Press, 2015). ISBN 978-0823262786
- Ernst Klee: "Euthanasie" im NS-Staat. Die "Vernichtung lebensunwerten Lebens". S. Fischer Verlag, Frankfurt am Main 1983, ISBN 3-10-039303-1. – Standardwerk bis heute mit vielen Informationen über Grafeneck.
- Karl Morlok: Wo bringt ihr uns hin? Geheime Reichssache Grafeneck, Stuttgart 1985. – Erste kleine Monographie.
- Dokumente zur "Euthanasie" (in German), vol. Dokument 87, Frankfurt am Main: Fischer, 1985, pp. 232f., ISBN 3596243270
- Klaus-Peter Drechsel: Beurteilt Vermessen Ermordet. Praxis der Euthanasie bis zum Ende des deutschen Faschismus. Duisburg 1993, ISBN 3-927388-37-8.
- Roland Müller u. a.: Krankenmord im Nationalsozialismus – Grafeneck und die "Euthanasie" in Südwestdeutschland. Stuttgart: Archiv der Stadt Stuttgart, Hohenheim Verlag. 2001. 150 Seiten, ISBN 3-89850-971-0.
- Henry Friedlander: The Origins of Nazi Genocide: From Euthanasia to the Final Solution. Chapel Hill: University of North Carolina Press, 1995.
- Thomas Stöckle: Grafeneck 1940. Die Euthanasie-Verbrechen in Südwestdeutschland, 3. Auflage Tübingen 2012, Silberburg-Verlag, ISBN 978-3-87407-507-7
- Jörg Kinzig, Thomas Stöckle (Hrsg.): 60 Jahre Tübinger Grafeneck-Prozess: Betrachtungen aus historischer, juristischer, medizinethischer und publizistischer Perspektive. Verlag Psychiatrie und Geschichte, Zwiefalten 2011; ISBN 978-3-931200-17-6
- Henning Tümmers: Justitia und die Krankenmorde: Der "Grafeneck-Prozess" in Tübingen. In: Stefanie Westermann, Richard Kühl, Tim Ohnhäuser (Ed.): NS-"Euthanasie" und Erinnerung: Vergangenheitsaufarbeitung – Gedenkformen – Betroffenenperspektiven. Medizin und Nationalsozialismus 3, LIT Verlag, Münster 2011, S. 95–122; ISBN 978-3-643-10608-7
- Werner Blesch, Konrad Kaiser u. a.: Uns wollen sie auf die Seite schaffen. Deportation und Ermordung von 262 behinderten Menschen der Johannesanstalten Mosbach und Schwarzach in den Jahren 1940 und 1944 In: Mosbach im Dritten Reich. Heft 2, Mosbach 1993.
- Hans-Werner Scheuing: "…als Menschenleben gegen Sachwerte gewogen wurden." Die Anstalt Mosbach im Dritten Reich und die Euthanasie-Diskussion heute. 2. Auflage. Universitätsverlag Winter, Heidelberg 2004, ISBN 3-8253-1607-6.
- Franka Rößner: Opfer staatlicher Gewalt – Gedenkstättenarbeit am Beispiel Grafeneck. In: Siegfried Frech/Frank Meier (Hrsg): Unterrichtsthema Staat und Gewalt. Kategoriale Zugänge und historische Beispiele. Wochenschau-Verlag, Schwalbach am Taunus 2012, ISBN 978-3-89974-820-8, S. 117–137.
- Müller, Thomas; Kanis-Seyfried, Uta; Reichelt, Bernd; Schepker, Renate (Ed.): Psychiatrie in Oberschwaben. Die Weissenau zwischen Versorgungsfunktion und universitärer Forschung. Zwiefalten 2017.
- Müller, Thomas; Schmidt-Michel, Paul-Otto; Schwarzbauer, Franz (Hg.): Vergangen? Spurensuche und Erinnerungsarbeit – Das Denkmal der grauen Busse. Zwiefalten 2017.
- Mueller, Thomas and Reichelt, Bernd: The ‘Poitrot Report’, 1945. The first public document on Nazi Euthanasia. History of Psychiatry, London, 2019, DOI: https://doi.org/10.1177/0957154X19842017.
- Mueller, Thomas: "Remembering psychiatric patients in Germany murdered by the Nazi regime." The Lancet – Psychiatry. Vol. 5, Issue 10, Oct. 2018, pp. 789–790 (plus web appendix).
- Schmidt-Michel, Paul-Otto; Müller, Thomas: "Der Umgang mit Angehörigen der Opfer der "Aktion T 4" durch die NS-Behörden und die Anstalten in Württemberg." Psychiatrische Praxis 45 (2018) S. 126-132.
