= Institute for Market-oriented Management =

German think tank

IMU – Institute for Market-oriented Management
- Other name: IMU
- Established: 1999
- Mission: Research
- Director: Christian Homburg
- Staff: 10
- Owner: University of Mannheim
- Location: Mannheim, Baden-Wuerttemberg, Germany
- Website: imu-mannheim.de

The Institute for Market-oriented Management (IMU; German: Institut für Marktorientierte Unternehmensführung) in Mannheim, Germany is a management, marketing and enterprise research institute and a member of the University of Mannheim. Under the leadership of Prof. Dr. Dr. h.c. mult. Christian Homburg, president of the institute, and Prof. Dr. Sabine Kuester, vice president of the institute, IMU employs a staff of about 10. The institute, founded in 1999, considers itself a forum for dialogue between scientific theory and company practice.

== Research ==
IMU stands conducts research in close collaboration with the Chairs of Marketing at the University of Mannheim. It publishes papers geared towards managers in global enterprises. Management topics relevant to best business practice are presented in a concise manner, and scientific research results are efficiently communicated. In many cases, these publications are based on application-oriented research and cooperation projects often involving a large number of global companies, such as BASF, Deutsche Telekom, E.ON, Google, Procter & Gamble, SAP AG, etc.

In general, the scientific studies conducted by the IMU institute analyze future or contemporary trends that may influence market-oriented management. On this basis, practice-oriented findings are derived and published in IMU's series of scientific working papers, such as "IMU Research Insights". Many of the publications were also published in scientific journals and honored with awards at international conferences (e.g., by the American Marketing Association, AMU).
