= University of Mannheim Business School =

Coordinates: 49°28′58″N 8°27′57.3″E

- Type: Public
- Established: 1963
- Affiliations: University of Mannheim
- Dean: Jürgen M. Schneider
- Academic staff: 22 Chairs with 37 professors
- Students: 4,000
- Location: Mannheim, Baden-Württemberg, Germany
- Website: www.home.bwl.uni-mannheim.de

The University of Mannheim Business School (UMBS) is among the oldest of the five schools comprising the University of Mannheim, located in Mannheim, Baden-Württemberg, Germany. The Business School, established in 1963, has its origins in the Handelsschule and covers the fields of Business Administration, Finance, Marketing, Accounting, Operations Research, Strategic Management and Corporate Law. The University of Mannheim Business School should not be confused with the Mannheim Business School, which is the umbrella organization for management education at the University of Mannheim. As the first German institution, the Business School of the University of Mannheim has gained the "Triple Crown" (Triple accreditation): It is accredited by AACSB International, the Association of MBAs (AMBA) and EFMD (EQUIS). With 37 chaired professors and about 4,000 students, the Business School ranks among the largest in Europe.

== Affiliations ==
Together with Tuck School of Business at Dartmouth, Keio University Business School in Tokyo, the School of Management of Fudan University in Shanghai, the Fundação Getúlio Vargas in Brazil and ESSEC Business School in France and Singapore, the University of Mannheim Business School forged an alliance of leading business schools from all parts of the world in 2010 called "Council on Business and Society". The Council on Business & Society convenes a biennial forum with faculty members from each of the partner schools and representatives of business, government, and non-governmental organizations from around the world. The inaugural forum, held at ESSEC in Paris in November 2012, focused on Corporate Governance and Leadership. The 2014 forum was hosted by Keio Business School in Tokyo and focused on Health Care Delivery.

== Programs ==
The undergraduate business degree has the most developed integrated international exchange program in Germany, with a mandatory exchange term during the third year and more than 95% of third-year class students participating. Students generally study for one semester abroad at one of more than 400 highly respected partner schools in more than 50 countries, for instance: McGill University, HEC Paris, ESSEC, Chinese University of Hong Kong, National University of Singapore, and Carnegie Mellon University. Instead of the exchange term, the program exceptionally allows students to have a further semester at Mannheim with a special curriculum focusing on international course load and business ethics.

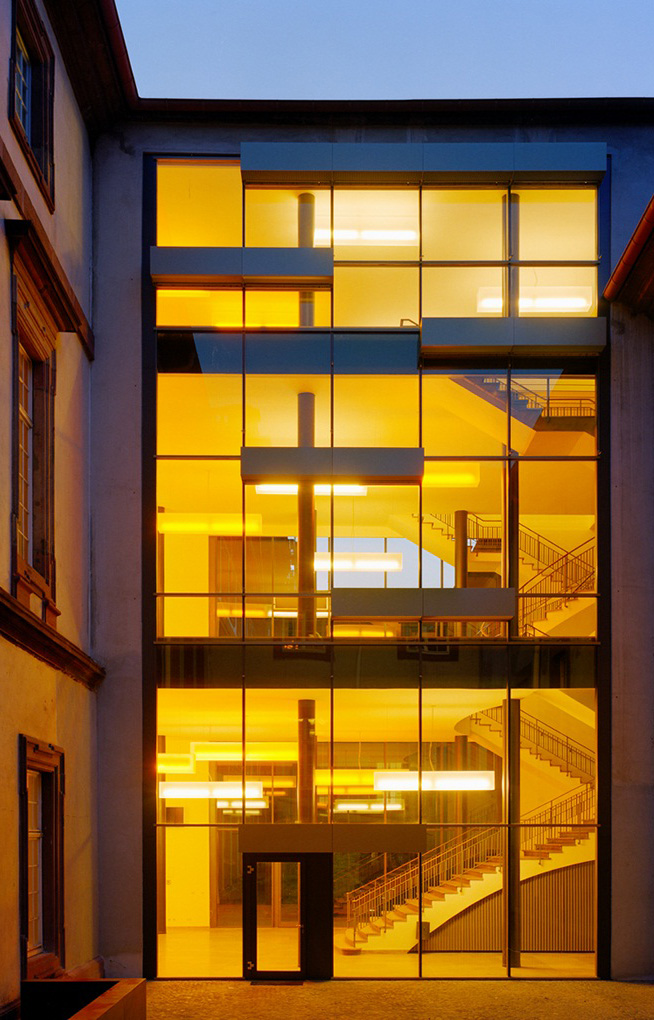
Rectorate's yard in the front of the Business School

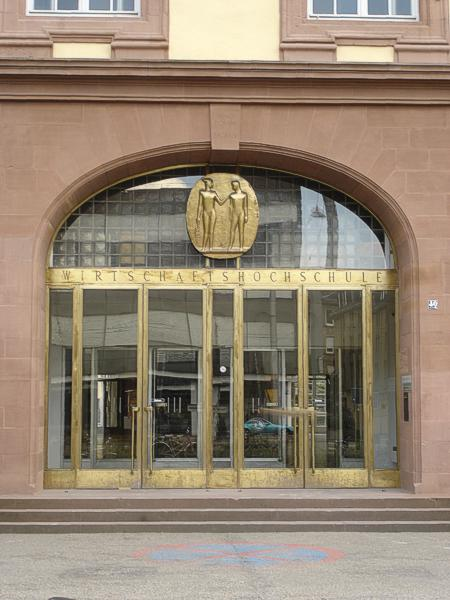
Main Entrance of the Business School

Besides the strong international outlay due to the integrated exchange semester, internationality and cross-cultural learning is emphasized by obligatory language tracks in the course curriculum (Chinese, Japanese, Spanish, Russian, Korean or Portuguese tracks possible) and 70% of courses held in English.

At graduate level the "Mannheim Master of Management (MMM)" offers an entirely open course curriculum that allows students to choose courses according to their own wishes. The MMM can thus be converted to a Master of Finance, Master of Accounting, Master of Marketing etc. The range of available courses include all business related subjects and interdisciplinary courses, such Corporate Finance and Banking, Marketing, Entrepreneurship, Strategic Management, Operations Research or Information Systems, and many more. Furthermore students can select courses out of the Economics, Sociology and Humanities departments.

Several double degree graduate programs with renowned institutions such as the Queen's University, ESSEC Business School Paris, Bocconi University, Copenhagen Business School, University of South Carolina are available and enable the students to pursue two master degrees at the same time. International exchange programs, comparable to those at undergraduate level (while not mandatory), also allow for cross-cultural cooperation and learning. Usually more than 40% of the MMM classes each year choose to participate in one of those programs.

== See also ==
- University of Mannheim
- Mannheim Business School
- EBS University of Business and Law
- Frankfurt School of Finance & Management
- University of St. Gallen
- WHU – Otto Beisheim School of Management
