= Mannheim Business School =

Umbrella organization for management education at the University of Mannheim

- Type: Business School
- Established: 2005
- Affiliations: University of Mannheim; Prechel Foundation; EQUIS; AACSB; AMBA; Triple accreditation
- Dean: Jens Wüstemann
- Faculty: 180
- Postgraduates: 650
- Location: Mannheim, Baden-Württemberg, Germany; 49°29′00″N 8°27′53″E
- Campus: Urban (Mannheim Palace)
- Colors: Blue, White
- Website: mannheim-business-school.com

Mannheim Business School (MBS) is the umbrella organization for management education at the University of Mannheim. The school was established in 2005 following the faculty of business of the University of Mannheim decision to bundle their MBA programs and executive education offerings. Considered the best German and one of the leading European business schools by several national and international rankings, it is amongst the most selective business school in Europe, admitting only about 17% of applicants.

The school offers four international MBA programs: the Mannheim Master of Business Administration (part-time and full-time), the Mannheim Executive MBA, the ESSEC & MANNHEIM Executive MBA (weekend and modular) and the MANNHEIM & TONGJI Executive MBA. The Mannheim Master of Accounting and Taxation program and the Mannheim Master in Management and Analytics program complete the MBS degree portfolio. Non-degree offerings include Executive Education and Digital Learning. Its legal form is a gGmbH, a non-profit Ltd, whose shareholders are the Prechel Foundation and the University of Mannheim.

The school is located in the city of Mannheim, Baden-Württemberg in Germany at Mannheim Palace, one of the largest baroque castles in Europe. International students at the school account for more than 60 percent. With class sizes ranging from a minimum of 30 participants in the Executive MBA programs to a maximum of 60 in the full-time MBA program, Mannheim Business School hosts a student body of 650 postgraduates in the degree programs on average.

It is triple accredited by the European Quality Improvement System (EQUIS), the Association to Advance Collegiate Schools of Business (AACSB) and the Association of MBAs (AMBA).

== History ==
The school was founded in 2005 when the faculty of business of the University of Mannheim decided to bundle their MBA programs and their executive education offerings. Christian Homburg became first president of Mannheim Business School. Jens Wüstemann was appointed as the 2nd president of the school in November 2010.

== Degree programs ==
The business school offers four international MBA programs: the Mannheim Master of Business Administration, which can be absolved in both full or part-time; the Mannheim Executive MBA; the ESSEC & MANNHEIM Executive MBA; and the MANNHEIM & TONGJI Executive MBA. Furthermore, the school offers a specialized master program in Accounting and Taxation and a part-time master program in Management Analytics.

=== Mannheim MBA ===
The Mannheim MBA program is offered either full-time (12 months) or part-time (24 months):

==== Mannheim MBA Full-Time (12 months) ====
The full-time program is structured in core courses and electives and starts every year in September. Students of the MBA Full-Time program can choose from two options to complete their degree. They can either finish within 12 months and directly start a job or prolong their MBA experience by three months and use this additional term for an exchange with one of the schools renowned partner institutions abroad or an internship at a globally leading company.

==== Mannheim MBA Part-Time (24 months) ====
The part-time program is structured in 12 modules which take place every second month. The 24 months program starts yearly in September and is spread over three calendar years. This program also includes two international study trips.

=== Mannheim Executive MBA ===
The Mannheim Executive MBA is a weekend-based part-time program (18 months). It starts every year in April and is spread over two calendar years. The program mainly takes place in Mannheim but offers one study trip to Asia and one study trip to the United States.

=== ESSEC & MANNHEIM Executive MBA ===
The ESSEC & MANNHEIM Executive MBA is a modular part-time program (18 months) with one week of lectures every eight weeks. The program starts every year in October and takes place in Mannheim and Paris in turns. The schedule includes one study trip to Asia and one study trip to the United States. Students are awarded with a double degree from both schools (ESSEC/France and MBS/Germany).

=== MANNHEIM & TONGJI Executive MBA ===
The MANNHEIM & TONGJI Executive MBA is a modular part-time program with 6 modules which last nine to eleven days. Modules are held on a bi-monthly basis alternately in Mannheim and Shanghai. The program is flexible and can be either completed within 18 months or extended over a period of up to 42 months. The program can be started with the May module (Mannheim) or the September module (Shanghai).

=== Mannheim Master of Accounting & Taxation ===
The Mannheim Master of Accounting & Taxation (M.Sc.) is a part-time program. Students can either choose the Accounting Track or the Taxation Track. Both tracks are offered in a modular format, with an overall program duration of three years. The Mannheim Master of Accounting & Taxation is taught primarily in German language and prepares for the German Tax Advisor or German Certified Public Accountant Exam.

=== Mannheim Master in Management Analytics ===
The Mannheim Master in Management Analytics (M.A.) is a modular part-time program with an overall program duration of 30 months. Core courses in methods, business and technology optimally prepare students to successfully master the challenges of digitalization. The Mannheim Master in Management Analytics is taught primarily in German language (70%, 30% of classes are taught in English).

== Non-degree offerings ==
Executive education and the digital learning platform complete the portfolio of the Mannheim Business School.

=== Executive education ===
Mannheim Business School offers customized programs which are tailored to the individual needs of an organization. Examples of current focus topics include Business Analytics, Innovation Development and Leadership 4.0.

=== Digital learning platform MBSx ===
MBSx makes it possible to study independent of time and place. The learning platform provides comprehensive Massive Open Online Courses (MOOC) and courses on select management topics. Examples of current MOOCs cover Digital Talent Management, People Analytics and Evidence-Based Management.

== Academics ==
=== Admissions ===
The admission to Mannheim's full-time MBA program was rated as the most selective in Europe, on par with the HEC Paris MBA and with an acceptance rate of only 20%.

Admission requirements for the Mannheim full-time MBA include an internationally recognized academic degree in any discipline (at least a Bachelor’s), at least 3 years of postgraduate working experience, fluency in English (TOEFL with a minimum score of 95, IELTS with a minimum score of 7.0) and a GMAT score (€200 tuition fee reduction with a score equal to or greater than 650).

=== Accreditations ===
In 2008, Mannheim Business School became the first institution in the German-speaking region to attain the 'Triple Crown'. Fewer than 1% of the estimated 10,000 business schools worldwide have accreditations from AACSB International, EQUIS and AMBA, the three leading international business school accreditation associations.

In addition, the Mannheim Master of Accounting & Taxation program is also accredited by the national accreditation agency AQAS.

Mannheim Business School is certified by evalag (Evaluationsagentur Baden-Württemberg) according to Section 33 (2) LHG (university law of the state of Baden-Wuerttemberg).

=== Rankings ===
Business school rankings

European MBA rankings
- QS (2027): 16
- FT (2026): 15

Global MBA rankings
- QS (2027): 39
- FT (2026): 65

==== International ====
- Top 80 in all important international Business School rankings (Bloomberg Businessweek, Financial Times, Forbes, The Economist)
- Top 20 for the 5th time in a row in the Financial Times European Business Schools Ranking (2018)
- Top 50 position for ten years in a row in The Economist Which MBA? ranking (2018)
- Best return on investment (ROI) worldwide in the QS Global MBA Ranking (2018/2019)

==== Germany ====
- Best German MBA program in the global MBA rankings of The Economist (2018), Bloomberg Businessweek (2018) and Forbes (2017)
- 1# in Germany in the international Bloomberg Businessweek MBA ranking (2017) in the category 'job placement' and #4 in the Financial Times Global MBA Ranking (2017) in the category 'employed at three months'

== Partnerships and cooperations ==
The association ‘Partner der Mannheimer Betriebswirtschaftslehre e.V.’ was founded by Mannheim Business School and the Business School of the University of Mannheim. It brings together the Mannheim faculty and executives of companies to form a network and interaction platform for a regular exchange of ideas between the academic and professional worlds.

America

- New York University Stern School of Business
- Queen's University
- Thunderbird School of Global Management

Europe

- EADA Business School
- ESSEC Business School
- Warwick Business School

Asia

- Chinese University of Hong Kong
- National University of Singapore
- Indian Institute of Management Ahmedabad

== See also ==
- University of Mannheim
- University of Mannheim Business School
