= Leonardo & Co. =

Leonardo & Co. is a Swiss investment bank. It was founded as Sal. Oppenheim jr & Cie. Corporate Finance (Switzerland) Ltd by Gerardo Braggiotti. It is headquartered in Zürich, Switzerland. It is a subsidiary of Gruppo Banca Leonardo, an Italian bank. It has offices in Amsterdam, Frankfurt, Madrid, Milan and Rome; and employs close to 54 financial professionals including 12 managing directors.

In 2015, Houlihan Lokey, a US-based global investment bank, acquired Leonardo & Co. for an undisclosed amount.
