= Mannheim Palace =

Baroque palace in Mannheim

Coordinates: 49°28′58.8″N 8°27′43.2″E

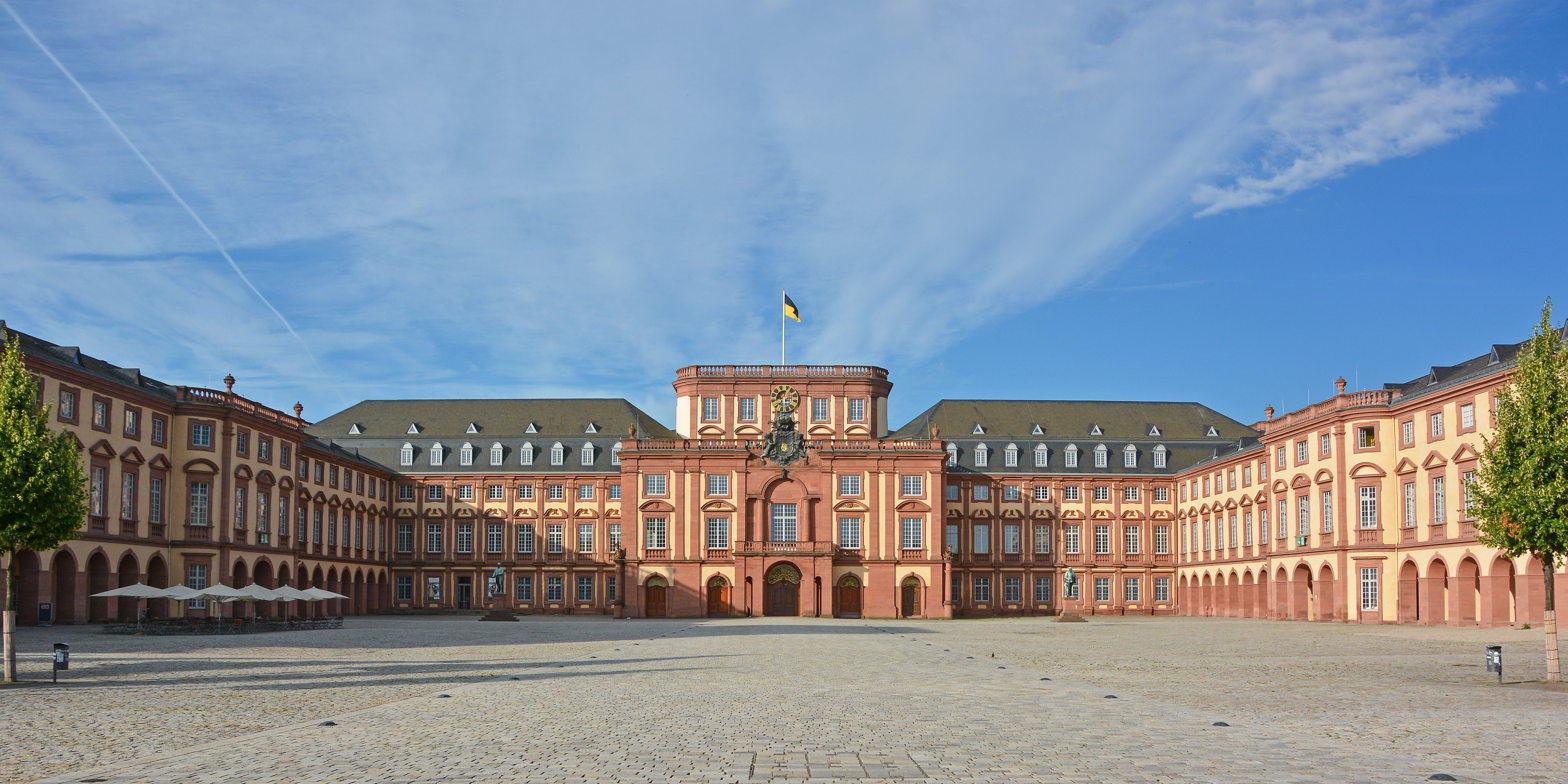
Mannheim Palace courtyard

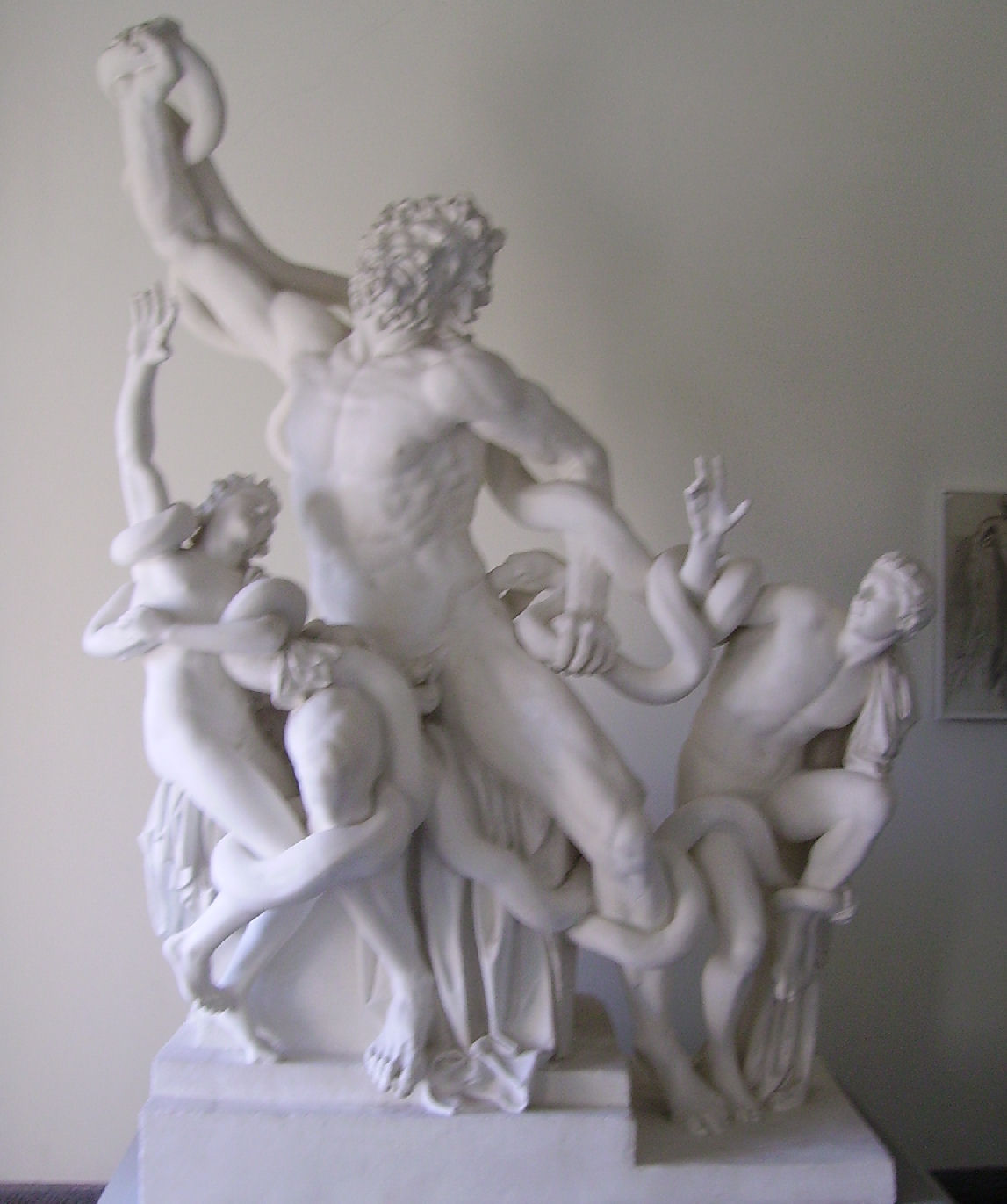
Copy of Laocoön and His Sons in the Mannheim Palace

Mannheim Palace (German: Mannheimer Schloss) is a large Baroque palace in Mannheim, Baden-Württemberg, Germany. It was originally the main residence of the Prince-electors of the Electorate of the Palatinate of the House of Wittelsbach until 1777. Part of the palace is used today by the University of Mannheim. The castle, which features tapestries, furniture, paintings, porcelain and silverware can be visited on a free-flow basis with audioguides.

== Origins ==
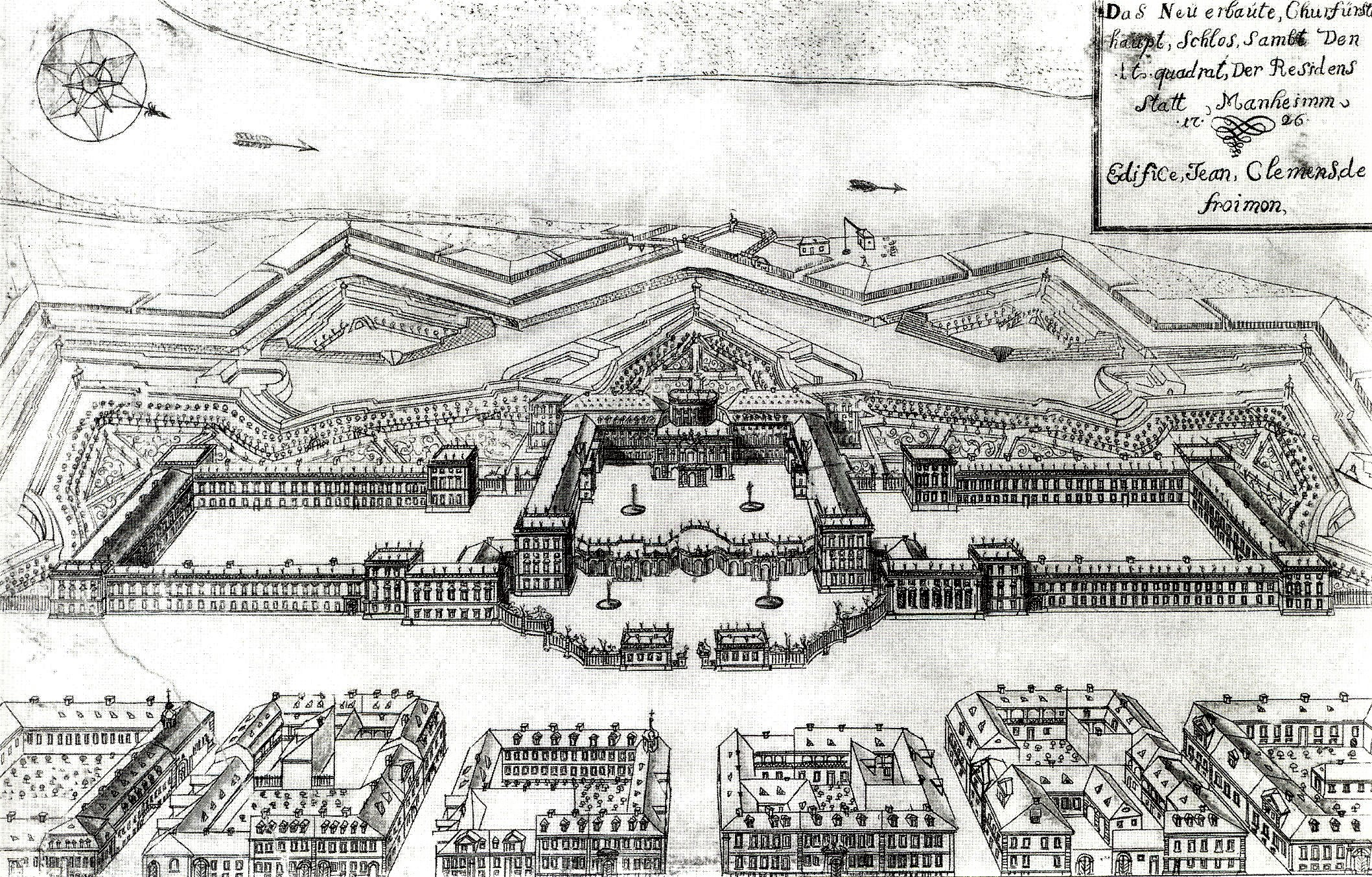
Layout of the Mannheim Palace in 1725

The city of Mannheim, founded in 1606, was fortified and at the present site of the castle there was a fortress called Friedrichsburg, sometimes serving as alternative residence for the Elector, one of the most important territorial princes of the Holy Roman Empire.

The actual palace dates from the 18th century. When Elector Karl III Philip had confessional controversies with the inhabitants of his capital Heidelberg, he decided to make Mannheim the Palatinate's new capital in 1720. Karl Philip decided to construct a new palace as his residence on the site of the old Friedrichsburg. It was part of a general trend among the German princes to create grand new residences in that era.

Construction was commenced solemnly on 2 June 1720. The building process was intended to cost about 300,000 Gulden, financed by an extraordinary "palace tax", but in the end, the palace cost about 2 million Gulden and severely worsened the Palatinate's financial situation. The first administrative institutions began using the palace in 1725, but Karl Philip was able to transfer his court to the new residence only in 1731. Construction was not completed until 1760.

Karl Philip died in 1742 and was succeeded by a distant relative, the young Count Palatine of Sulzbach and later Duke of Bavaria Charles Theodor. During his reign, the palace and the city of Mannheim saw their zenith. The glamour of the Elector's court and Mannheim's famous cultural life lasted until 1778, when Karl Theodor became Elector of Bavaria by inheritance and he moved his court to Munich. Although Mannheim kept the title of "residence", the palace was used merely as accommodation for several administrative bodies.

Things worsened further during the Napoleonic Wars, when Mannheim was besieged. During Napoleon's reorganization of Germany, the Electorate of the Palatinate was split up and Mannheim became part of the Grand Duchy of Baden, thus losing its capital/residence status. Some glamour returned to Mannheim Palace when Stéphanie de Beauharnais, the consort of Grand Duke Karl of Baden, resided here after 1806. For most of the 19th and early 20th centuries, the palace served no uniform purpose, being used as a representative building and a museum for the city.

In World War II, the palace was heavily bombed and partly destroyed. Many people supported demolishing it after the war to create space for a more modern city architecture. These plans came to nothing and in recent years the palace has been renovated extensively thanks to private donations and government funding totaling more than 54 million euro.

== Use as university ==
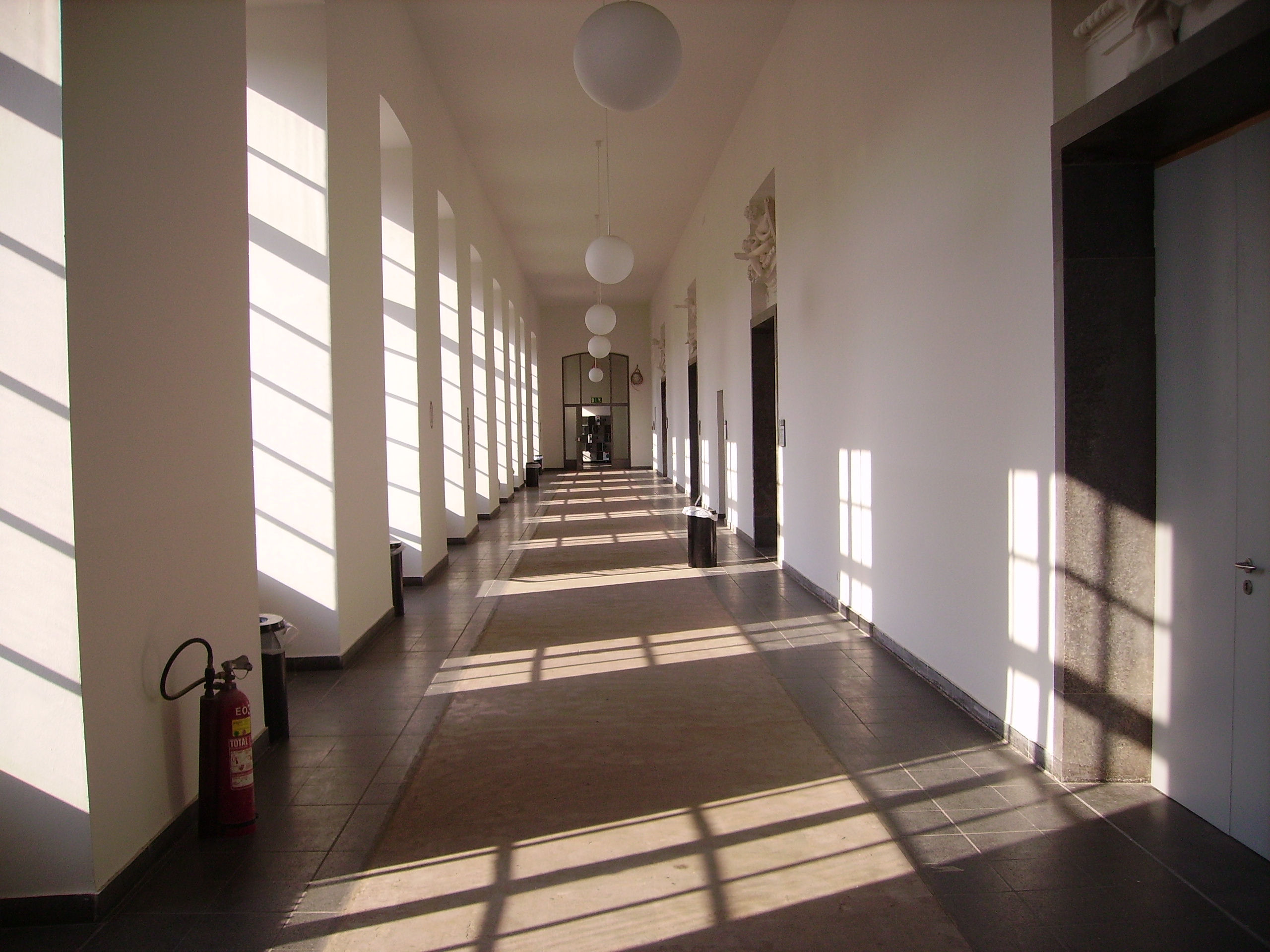
Hallway in the Mannheim Palace university section

Elector Karl Theodor founded the Kurpfälzische Akademie der Wissenschaften as early as 1763, and although there was no continuous existence of a scientific college in Mannheim, the Wirtschaftshochschule, or business college, founded in 1907, saw itself in the tradition of Karl Theodor's earlier college. The college expanded its subjects program in 1967, thus gaining "university" status. The University of Mannheim still uses Mannheim Palace as its central building complex and although many university buildings are dispersed all over the city center, key institutions such as the rectorate or the main library are accommodated in the palace, besides countless lecture halls and offices.

== Structure ==
The site of the palace is impressive, although the construction of roads and railway tracks has diminished its dominating look. To the southwest, it faces the Rhine and Ludwigshafen. To the northeast the palace presents its 450 m long front to the Mannheim city centre. By surrounding an area of 6 hectare the castle is one of Europe's biggest palaces and the second biggest one in Baroque style, second only after Versailles. For reasons of prestige the architects made sure that Mannheim Palace has one more window than Versailles. The Breite Straße runs from the palace to Mannheim's central square, the Paradeplatz.

The central part of the palace is the Mittelbau with its representative halls. Today, the Mittelbau holds state rooms and the Rittersaal hall. The Mittelbau is flanked by the Ehrenhof West and Ehrenhof Ost wings, which include the Court of Honor in front of the Mittelbau. In those two wings, there are mainly lecture halls and offices of the university's humanities section. Below the Ehrenhof, there is a massive bunker dating from World War II. Initially constructed as defensive military fortification designed to protect up to 1,500 residents or valued materials from Russian and Allied bombing attacks, it served as a hotel with a capacity for up to 65 guests after the war. Today it is used as occasional exposition space for modern and urban art, e.g. during the Long Night of Museums in Mannheim.

The northern wing includes the impressive Schlosskirche (palace church) and the law section, as well as Mannheim's Amtsgericht (lower district court). The southern/eastern wing is much larger than the northern one, including the Schneckenhof yard (a popular university party ground) and holding most of the university's central institutions, as well as the largest lecture halls and the central Hasso Plattner Library. Two sculptures are located on the central courtyard and represent the two founders of the Mannheim Palace Charles III Philip, Elector Palatine and Charles Theodore, Elector of Bavaria.

The palace has been repainted in a bright ochre yellow, the Mittelbau (Corps de Logis) has been thoroughly rebuilt (including a new roof construction), and the Ehrenhof (Court of Honor) was restructured and paved with granite.

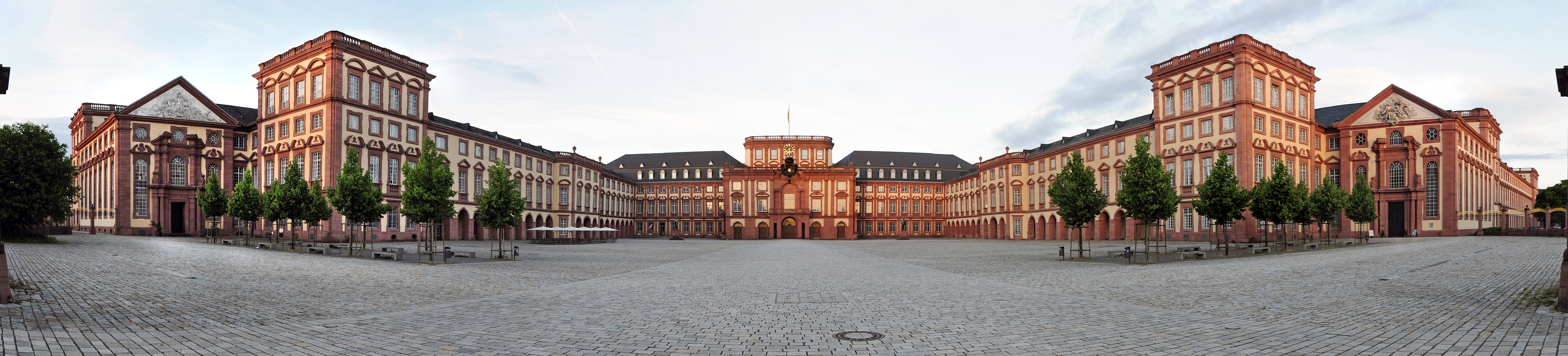
Mannheim Palace, 180 degrees panoramic view

== See also ==
- List of Baroque residences
- Mannheim Forum
