= Gomadingen =

- Municipality
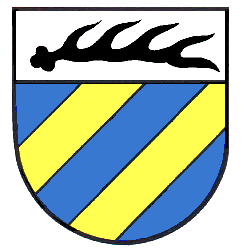
- Coat of arms

- Location of Gomadingen within Reutlingen district
- Interactive map of Gomadingen
- Location within Germany Location within Baden-Württemberg
- Coordinates: 48°24′01″N 09°23′31″E
- Country: Germany
- State: Baden-Württemberg
- Admin. region: Tübingen
- District: Reutlingen
- Subdivisions: 7 Ortsteile

Government
  - Mayor (2018–26): Klemens Betz

Area
  - Total: 45.85 km^{2} (17.70 sq mi)
- Elevation: 693 m (2,274 ft)

Population (2025-12-31)
  - Total: 2,215
  - Density: 48.31/km^{2} (125.1/sq mi)
- Time zone: UTC+01:00 (CET)
  - Summer (DST): UTC+02:00 (CEST)
- Postal codes: 72532
- Dialling codes: 07385
- Vehicle registration: RT
- Website: www.gomadingen.de

Gomadingen is a town in the district of Reutlingen in Baden-Württemberg in Germany. About 85% of its territory is located on the Swabian Alps. It's the district where the Grafeneck Castle is situated. During the II World War, the castle was home of the Grafeneck Euthanasia Centre (German: NS-Tötungsanstalt Grafeneck), one of the main Nazi Germany's killing centres part of their Action T4 programme.

== History ==
Built around 1560, the Grafeneck Castle served as a hunting lodge to the dukes of Württemberg. In the 19th Century, it was used as the Forest Service and in 1928 the Samaritan Foundation acquired it, setting up a handicapped home. In the times of National Socialism, the Grafeneck Castle served in as a killing center - the Nazi Euthansasieaktion (later T4 Action) killed 10,654 disabled and sick people through lethal injections and gas. They were transported mainly from southern Germany and burned on site in a crematorium. The French occupying forces returned the site in 1946/47 back to the Samaritan Foundation, whom reestablished it as a center for disabled and mentally ill people and still operates to this day. Already in the fifties, the development of the cemetery began as a memorial. In 2005, the documentation center Grafeneck Memorial was finally built.

== Mayors ==
Since 1994 Klemens Betz is the mayor of Gomadingen. He was reelected in 2002 and 2010.

== Photo gallery ==
Gomadingen

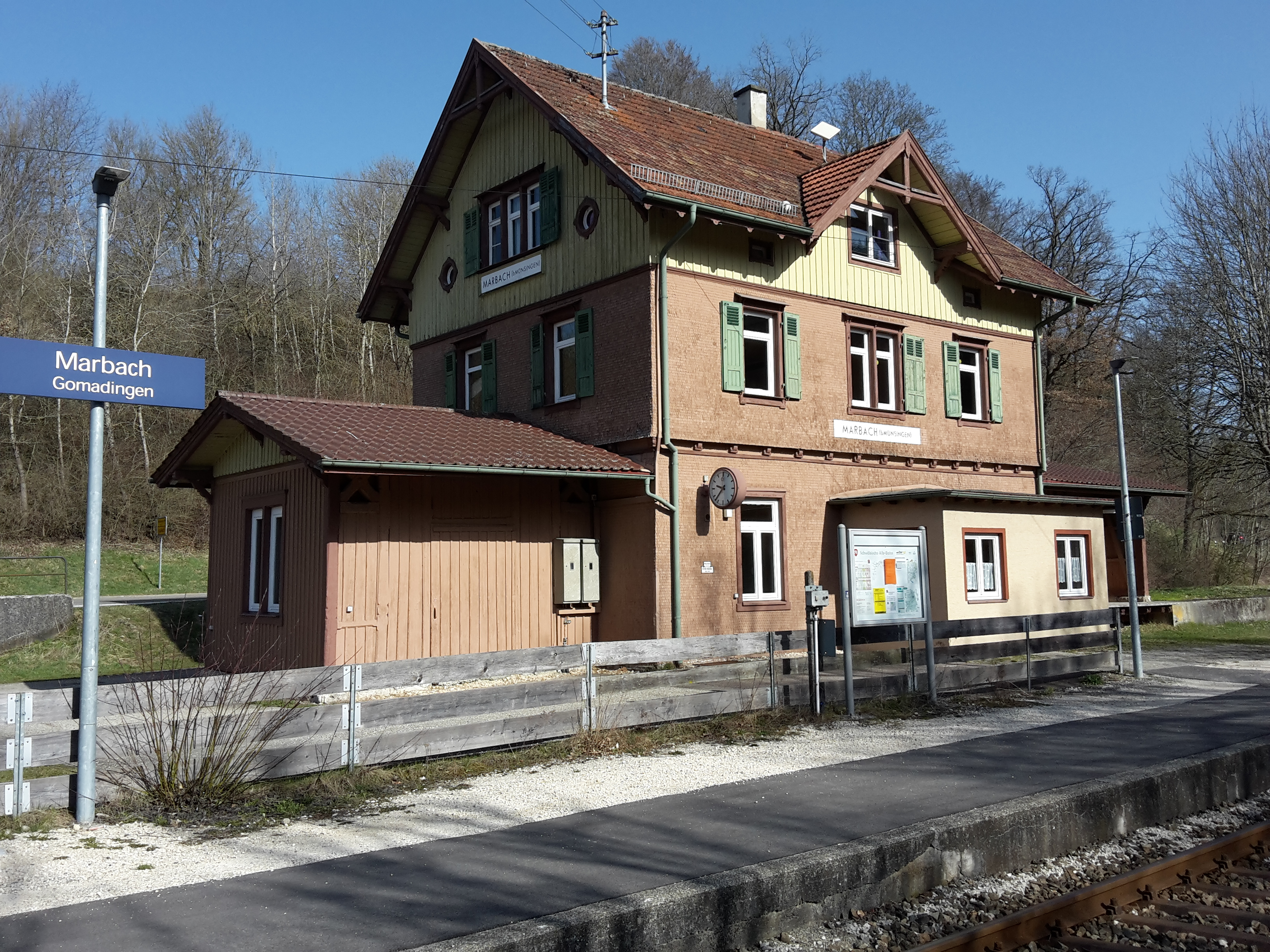
Marbach station

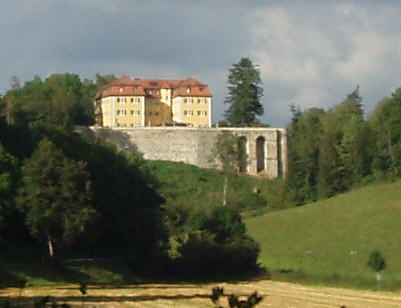
Grafeneck Castle

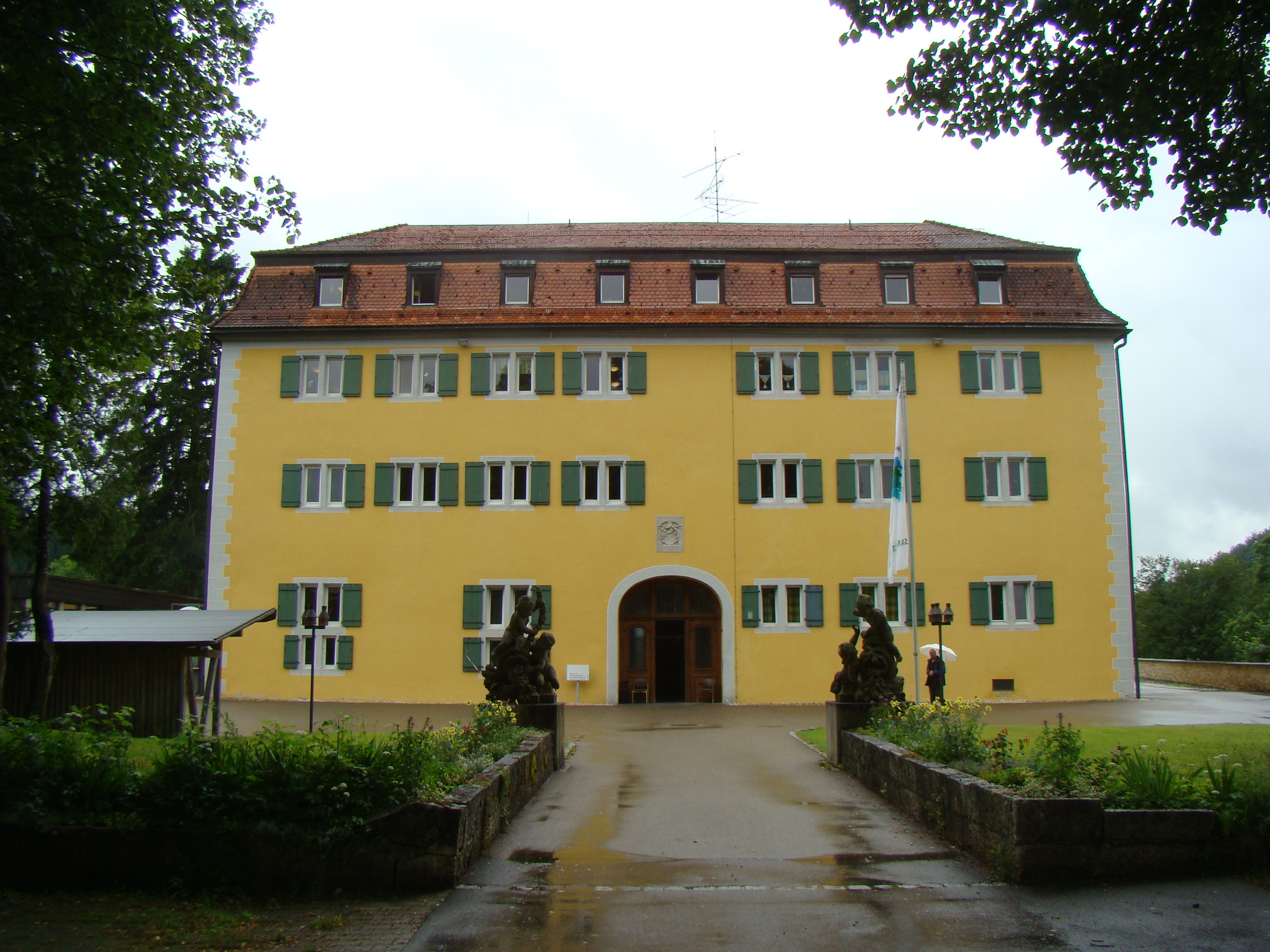
Grafeneck Castle

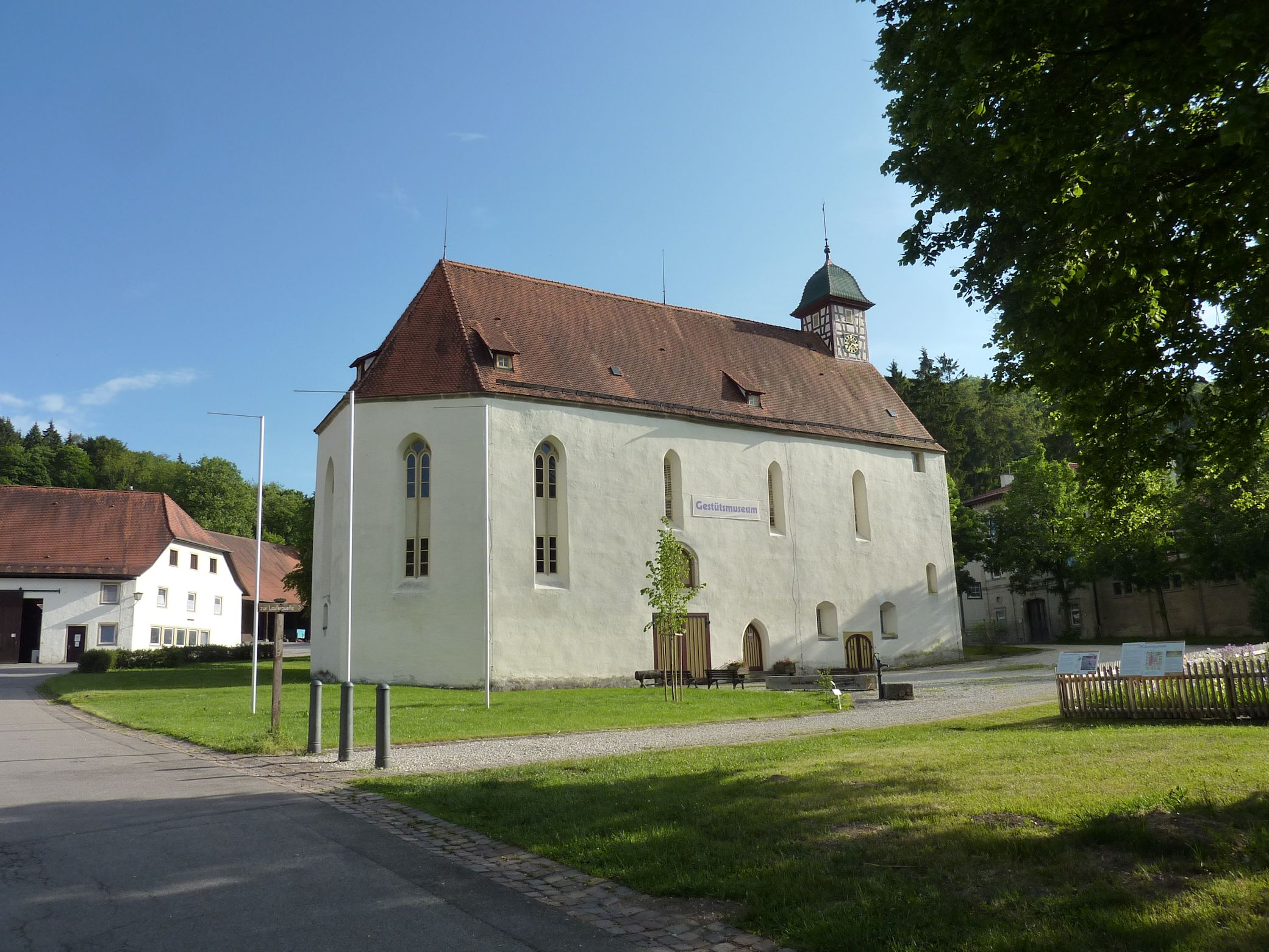
Offenhausen

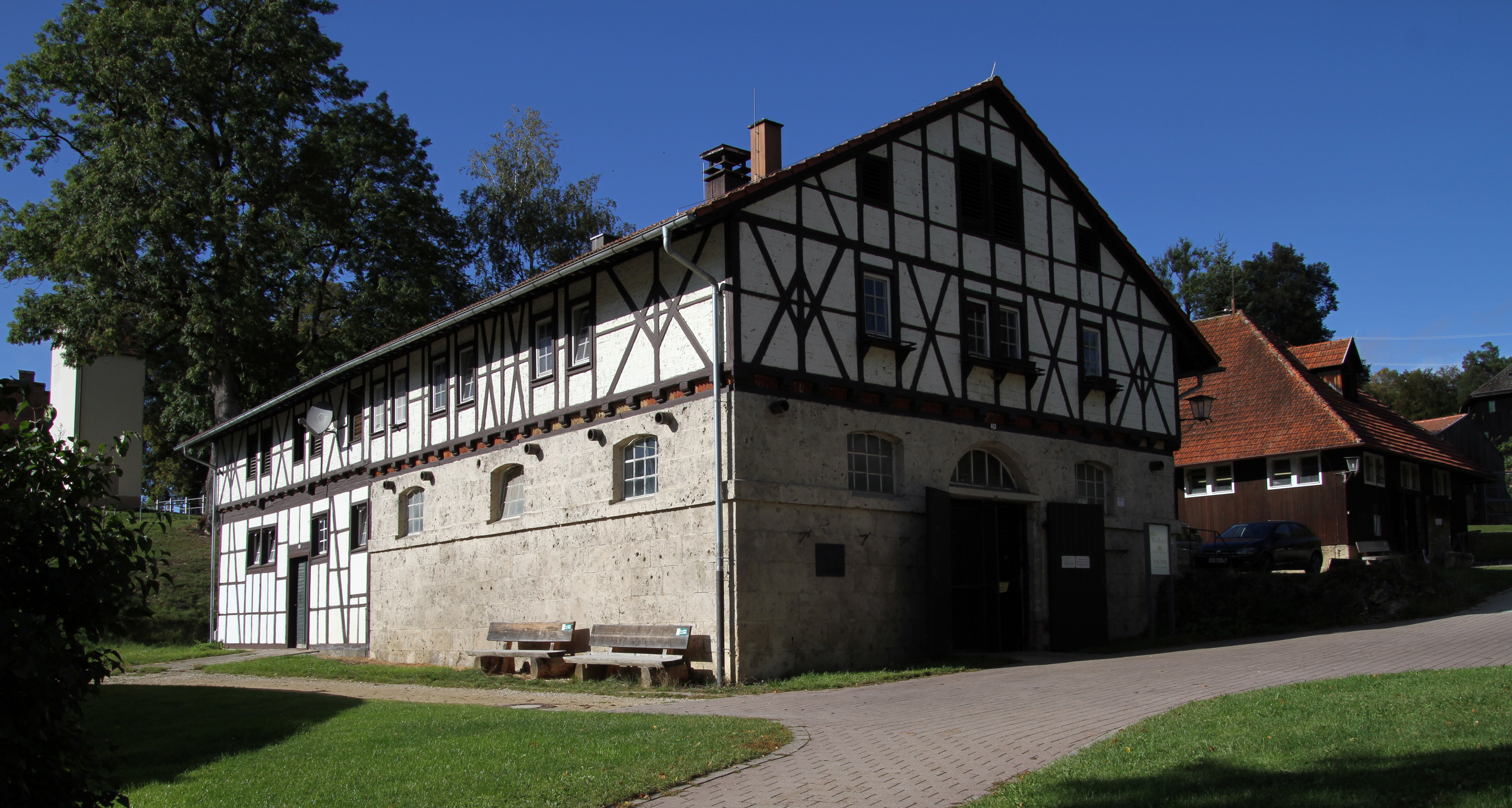
Marbach stud

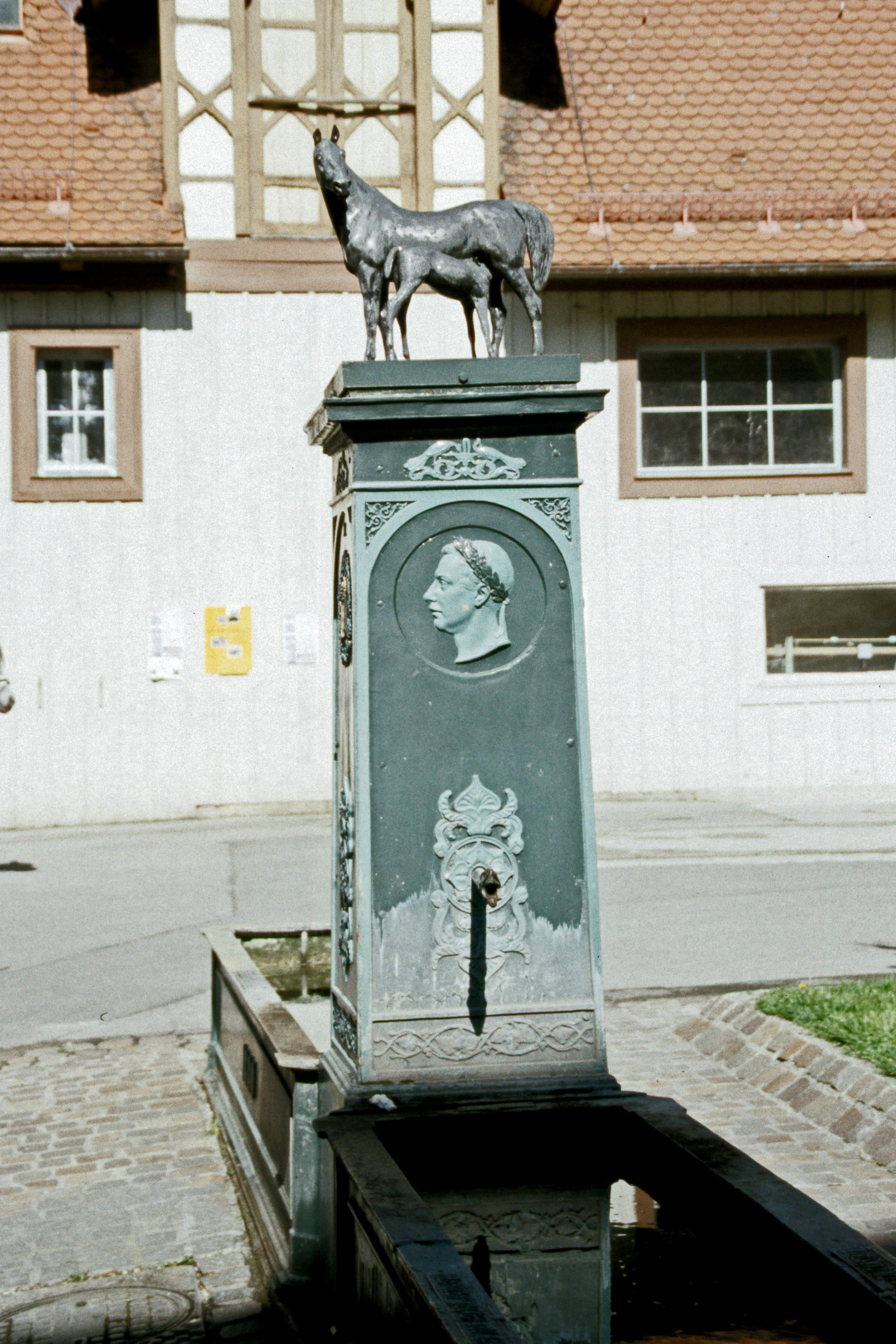
Marbach stud

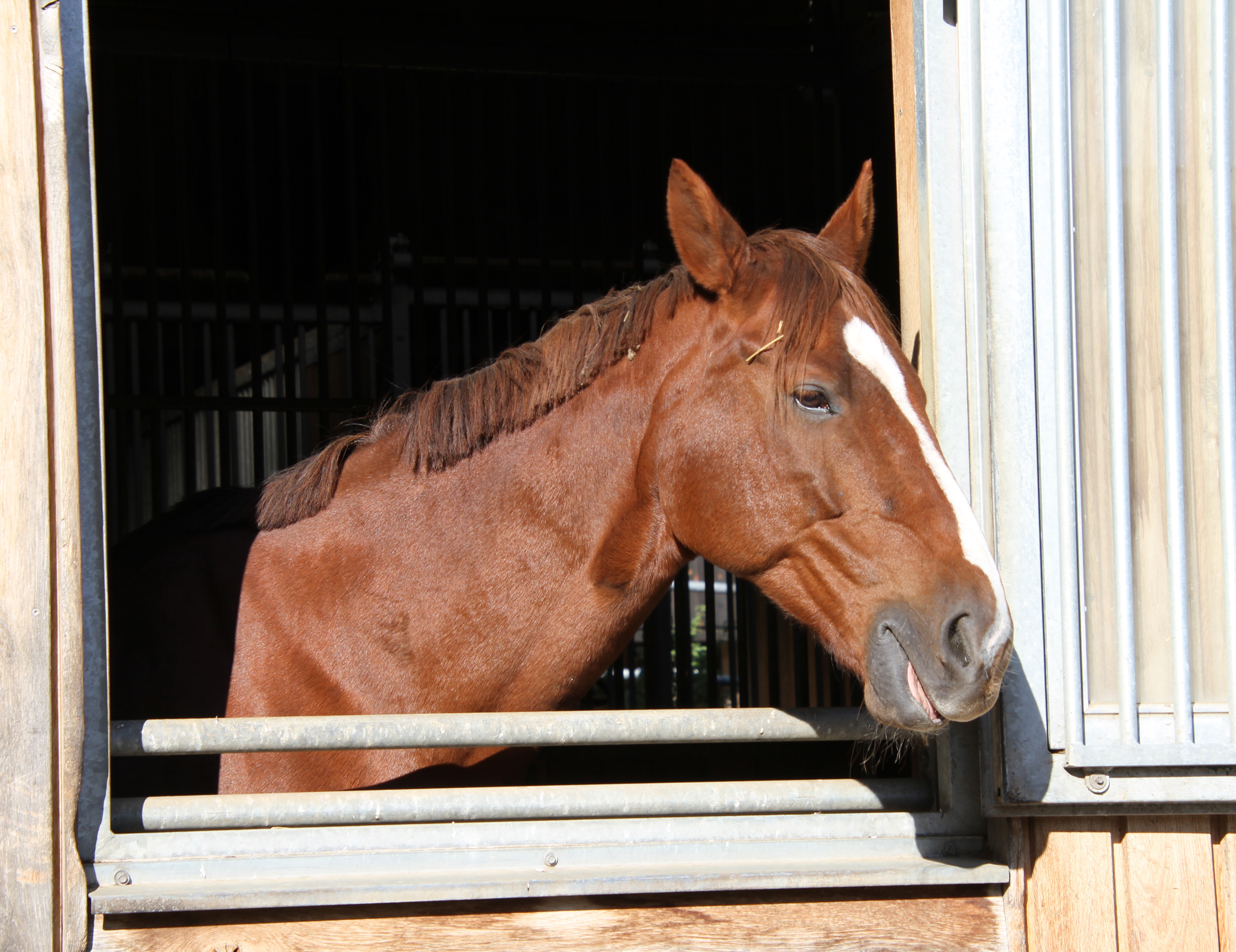
Marbach stud

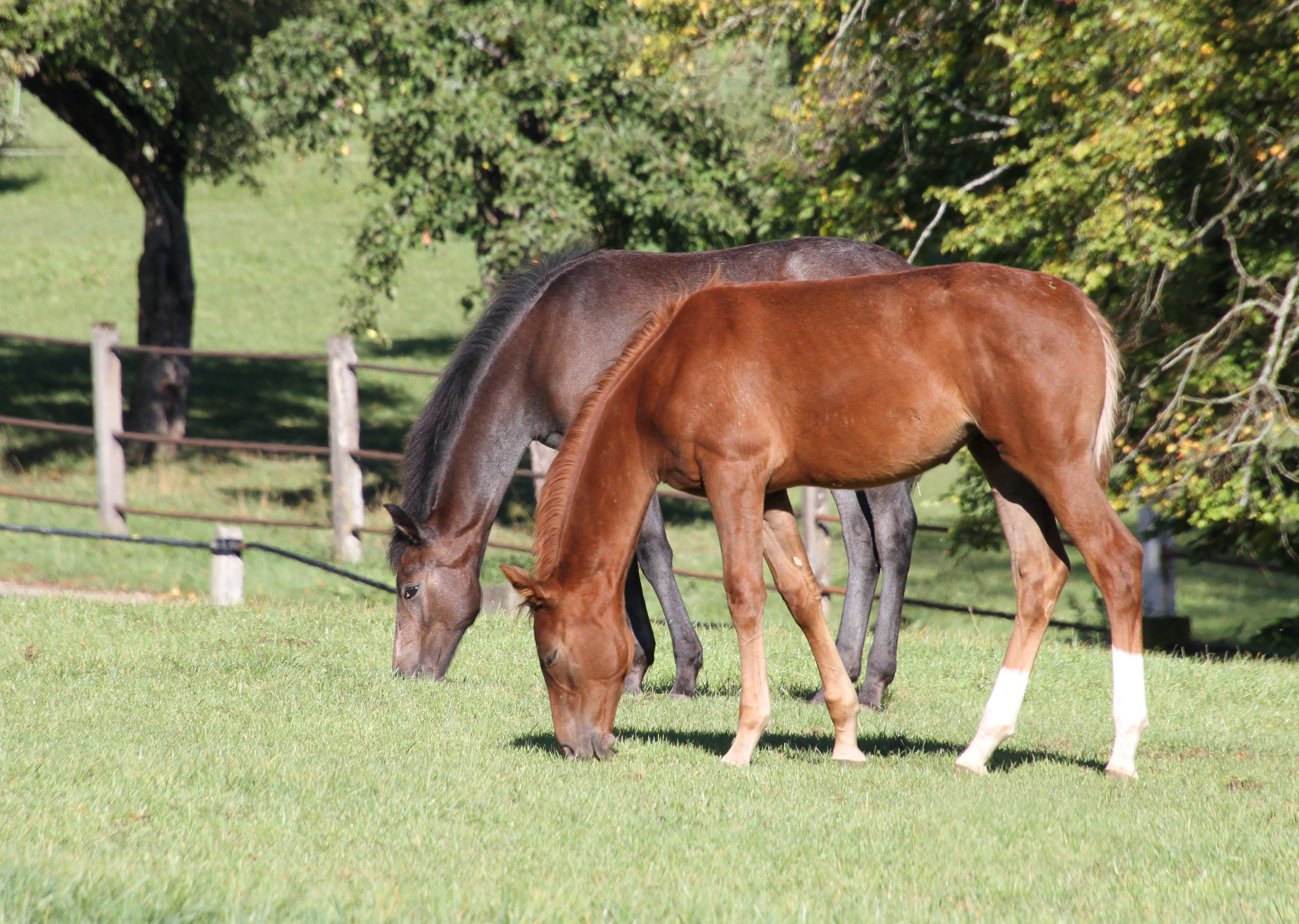
Marbach stud
