= Roland Berger (company) =

Global strategy consulting firm

Roland Berger Holding GmbH & Co. KGaA
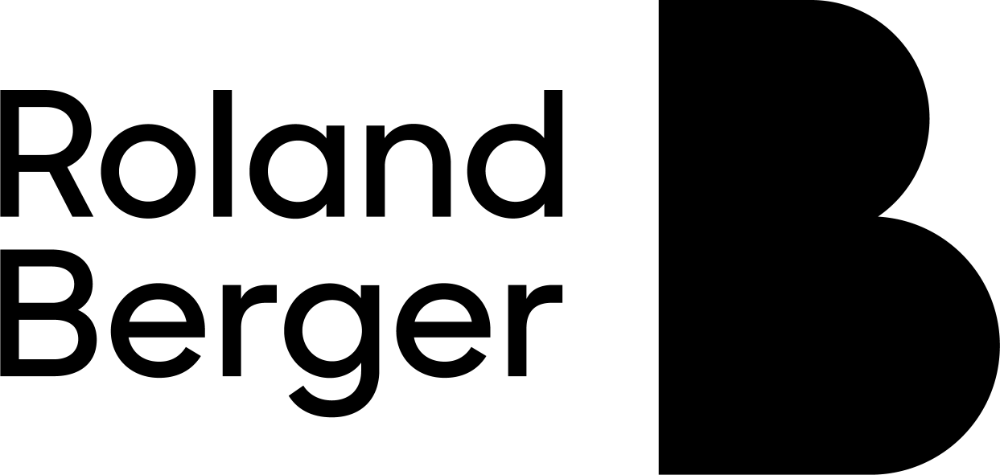
- Type: Partnership limited by shares (GmbH & Co. KGaA)
- Industry: Management consulting
- Founded: 1967; 59 years ago
- Headquarters: Munich, Germany
- Key people: Stefan Schaible (Global Managing Partner); Robert C. Henske (Chairman of the Supervisory Board)
- Revenue: > €1 billion
- Number of employees: approx. 3,500
- Website: www.rolandberger.com

Roland Berger is an international management consulting firm headquartered in Munich, Germany. Founded in 1967, the firm has built an international presence over the decades. Today, approximately 3,500 employees work at more than 50 offices worldwide. In 2023, revenue exceeded one billion euros. The firm is entirely owned by its partners.

Roland Berger is a strategy consultancy serving all industries and management functions, with a particular focus on operational and transformational process optimization, restructuring and reorganization, transaction advisory, digitalization, and sustainability. Its clients include major industrial and service corporations as well as public sector organizations.

== History ==
=== Early history ===
In 1967, Roland Berger founded the sole proprietorship Roland Berger International Marketing Consultants after spending five years as a consultant at the Boston Consulting Group. One of the new firm's first engagements was developing an advertising concept for the tour operator Touropa. Over time, the firm's focus shifted from marketing consulting toward strategy consulting. In doing so, Berger successfully introduced the strategy consulting business model — until then primarily known in the United States — to Germany.

Two years after its founding, the firm opened its first international office in Milan in 1969, followed by São Paulo in 1976. Additional offices were subsequently opened in France, the United Kingdom, Japan, Spain, and the United States. To underscore its international orientation, Berger renamed the firm Roland Berger & Partner International Management Consultants. In 1980, Roland Berger became the first European management consultancy to be admitted to the Association of Consulting Management Engineers (ACME), the industry's most prestigious professional association. Over the years, in addition to its global presence spanning more than 50 offices, the firm has also developed a comprehensive global service portfolio.

=== External ownership ===
Roland Berger participated in the founding of various consortia and established a holding company as an umbrella entity. After the firm had grown into Europe's leading strategy consultancy, Deutsche Bank, under the leadership of Alfred Herrhausen, gradually acquired a qualified majority stake beginning in 1987. The objective was to establish the consulting firm as an additional revenue pillar for the bank.

Following Deutsche Bank's investment, Roland Berger nearly doubled its revenue, primarily driven by further international expansion. However, regulatory restrictions prevented the firm from entering the U.S. market, as consulting firms more than 5% owned by a bank were prohibited from operating in the United States at the time. To continue its internationalization despite this constraint, the firm turned to the former Eastern Bloc countries during the 1990s and opened offices in Japan, China, and India.

In addition to its international activities, the firm also expanded its business in its German home market. Beyond private-sector engagements, it notably advised the Treuhandanstalt on the privatization and restructuring of former state-owned enterprises of the German Democratic Republic. Roland Berger played a key role in the evaluation of corporate restructuring plans.

=== Transition to partnership ===
Shortly after the assassination of Alfred Herrhausen by the Red Army Faction (RAF) in 1989, the collaboration between Roland Berger and Deutsche Bank began to falter. This was one of the reasons the Roland Berger partners initiated a management buyout in 1998. The leadership team expected the exit of Deutsche Bank to accelerate growth, as profits could be reinvested more flexibly. It also gave the firm unrestricted access to the U.S. market. Deutsche Bank retained a single-digit minority stake until 2000.

In 2001, the founder Roland Berger announced his withdrawal from the firm's executive management. He transitioned to the supervisory board, initially as chairman and later as honorary chairman. His complete departure from the company followed in 2010, marking the formal separation between Roland Berger the individual and Roland Berger the firm.

In 2010, the consultancy announced plans to merge with the consulting division of British firm Deloitte. The plans failed, however, due to resistance from the Roland Berger partners, who decided to continue operating the firm independently. Through a capital increase by the partners and the founder, the firm secured its independence and the ability to pursue its internationalization and business expansion on its own terms.

=== Recent developments ===
Following Burkhard Schwenker (2002–2010) and Martin C. Wittig (2010–2014), Charles-Édouard Bouée was elected chief executive officer (CEO). For the first time, an international partner led the firm. His appointment initiated a cultural transformation that included a rejuvenation of the leadership team. Together with Stefan Schaible, Bouée overhauled the business model and organizational structure. The service portfolio was expanded, particularly in the area of digital technologies. The name suffix "Strategy Consultants," which had been added in 2001, was dropped.

After Bouée stepped down in 2019, Stefan Schaible was elected Global Managing Partner by the partnership. He had previously led the firm's operations in Germany and Europe for several years, achieving double-digit growth rates. Under his leadership, the consulting firm is continuing its steady growth trajectory through further internationalization of the business and selective acquisitions.

In 2022, the firm acquired Polarixpartner, a German management consultancy specializing in the manufacturing industry that advised clients on strategy development as well as cost and process optimization to improve efficiency. This strengthened Roland Berger's expertise in cost optimization. In February 2023, the acquisition of Munich-based management consultancy Candidus followed, which was integrated into the restructuring practice. In late 2023, the firm announced the acquisition of Amane Advisors, a British consultancy specializing in water management, to expand its sustainability offering. Also in 2023, the partners resolved to convert the legal form of the Roland Berger Holding GmbH into a Kommanditgesellschaft auf Aktien (KGaA), a partnership limited by shares under German law. That same year, the firm achieved global revenue exceeding one billion euros for the first time.

In recent years, Roland Berger has increasingly focused on innovation, new technologies, and sustainability. In this context, the firm has highlighted the use of artificial intelligence (AI) to drive productivity improvements.

Regarding sustainability, the firm has been expanding its advisory capabilities, including through the acquisition of Amane Advisors. Beyond its client-facing sustainability work, Roland Berger has set both near-term sustainability targets and a net-zero emissions target for 2040, both scientifically validated by the Science Based Targets initiative (SBTi).

== Corporate structure ==
=== Legal form ===
The Roland Berger Holding is a Kommanditgesellschaft auf Aktien (KGaA), a partnership limited by shares under German law, headquartered in Munich. Its general partner is Roland Berger Holding Management GmbH. The consultancy operates internationally, with local subsidiaries managing operations in the respective countries.

=== Ownership ===
Roland Berger is entirely owned by its partners, who also serve as consultants within the firm. This partnership-based ownership model, common among major international consultancies, promotes the firm's long-term independence and enables the partners to participate in strategic direction-setting and financial decision-making. The ownership structure also ensures that Roland Berger can operate independently of external investors. As of November 2024, the firm employs approximately 350 partners across more than 50 offices.

=== Leadership ===
Roland Berger is led by a seven-member executive committee. The committee consists of three elected members — Stefan Schaible (spokesperson), Marcus Berret, and Denis Depoux — and four appointed members: Per Breuer, Edeltraud Leibrock, Maria Mikhaylenko, and Matthias Rückriegel. The supervisory board comprises Robert C. Henske (chairman), René R. Seijger (deputy chairman), Brandon Boyle, Felix Mogge, and Constanze Schweinsteiger.

== Operations ==
=== Service areas ===
Roland Berger serves all industries and management functions. As a strategy consultancy, the firm develops innovative solutions for its clients. Roland Berger relies on a broad-based team that combine expertise from different industries. By promoting technologies such as artificial intelligence and sustainable business models, the firm strengthens its clients' resilience and helps them adapt to complex market changes.

=== Global locations ===
Roland Berger maintains a presence at more than 50 offices worldwide, spanning Europe, Asia, North and South America, and the Middle East. The firm has offices in major economic centers including Paris, London, Chicago, Dubai, Tokyo, and Shanghai.
