= Afrika-Haus Freiberg =

Architectural structure

Coordinates: 48°56′16″N 9°10′46″E

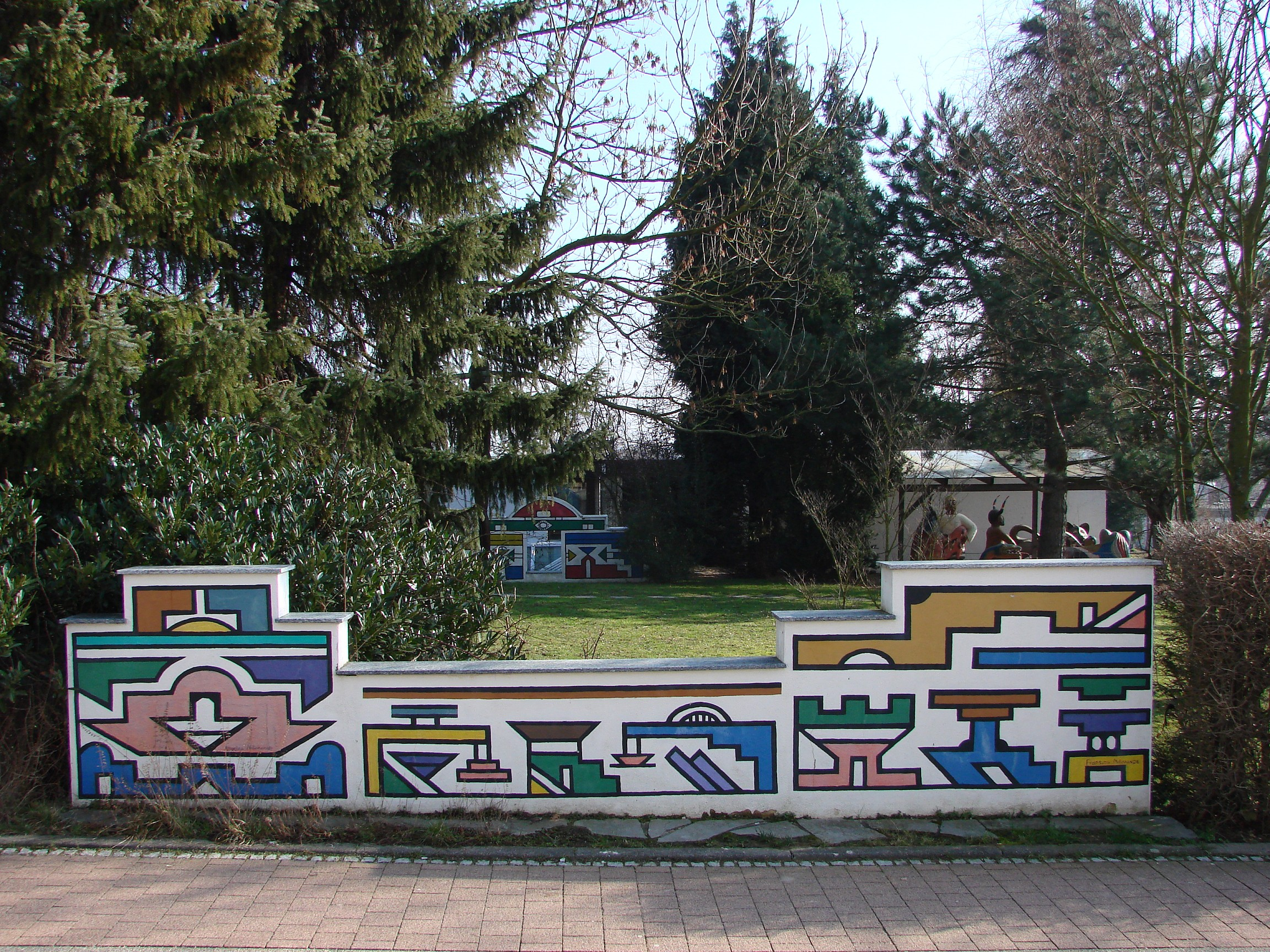
One of the artworks at the museum

Afrika-Haus Freiberg, Baden-Württemberg

The Afrika-Haus Freiberg is a museum of modern African art at Freiberg am Neckar in Germany.

== Concept ==
The Afrika house contains a huge number of modern African works of art from 1920 onwards. All the geographic regions are represented, as well as a great range of directions in art. The architectural design of the gardens is modelled on the Umuzi, the Ndebele Kraal.

The exhibition shows the influence of old African cultural customs on modern art. In addition, it demonstrates how African art is linked to the cults of animism, ancestor worship and fertility, along with mythical ideas involving magic, mask cults, sorcery and ghosts.

According to Arthur Benseler, founder of the museum, the Afrikahaus provides a place for personal exchange between African artists, thereby supporting intercultural communication and helping to avoid the mistaken cultural ideas of apartheid, replacing these through new artistic dimensions.

== Outdoor sculptures and paintings ==
At the entrance to the garden visitors are welcomed by two extraordinarily tall, thin Maasai statues made of mahogany, which lead the visitors to colorful sculptures of concrete and cement. These concrete statues are part of the Cult of the dead, which is still practised today in western Africa. Traditionally a part of the second funeral ceremonies, they are also occasionally used for advertising purposes.

In addition, there are a number of colorful statues, which represent the Voodoo Pantheon of the deities Legba and Zangbeto, accompanied by two lions and judging over a sinner. Originally this group, created by artist Cyprien Tokoudagba (Benin), was part of the exhibition Magiciens de la terre in the Centre Pompidou (Paris) in 1989.

The outside walls and parts of the façade are covered in brightly coloured geometric patterns. These designs, which are painted in South Africa by the women of the Ndebele tribe, are called Amagama (narrative paintings). These patterns originate from an older art form: the production of jewellery and garments, such as breast plates and jewellery made out of colourful glass beads which the men and women wear around their forehead, arms, waist and feet. When the Ndebele tribe finally settled, this language of colours and forms in their jewellery was used on the outer walls of their houses.

== Panel paintings from the Congo ==
Congolese panel painting stemmed from the country's traditional painting of houses. Since this art form, which was painted on the clay walls of the buildings, was always subjected to weathering, it needed to be constantly repainted. Apart from relatively few photographic images, hardly any evidence of this art form has survived to this day.

Around 1930, this art form of colourful patterns and, occasionally, depictions of figures and objects was popular among the Europeans and, in particular, the Belgian colonial agent Georges Thiry. The Europeans encouraged African artists such as Dijalatendo (originally Tschelatendu which means stone thrower) to make their work more permanent using watercolour on paper.

The Afrika house holds a collection of examples of this particular kind of art ranging from the 1920s. As well as Djilatendo, who was later honoured by the Académie Française, the collection includes works by his contemporary artists D’Ekibondo and Albert Lubaki.

The Africa House of Freiberg shows several examples – impressive, stylized depictions of faces or spirit beings, additionally the sculpture of a lion by the artists Stephen Mtengwa, Henry Munyaradzi, Josia Mwanzi und NDale Wilo. The people of the Africa House are particularly proud of a heavily stylized depiction of a human head, the so-called Spatenkopf, a sculpture by the famous artist Richard Mteki.

Since the 1940s there has been a series of artistic works on display from the art college Académie de l'art populaire congolais, founded by Pierre Romain Desfossés. The collection consists of works by various artists, among which is Pili-Pili Mulongby who painted color-coordinated poetic landscapes and animal depictions. Furthermore, there are Bela Borkémas and Mwenze Kibwanga. Borkémas developed his own fingerpainting technique which enabled him to achieve effects similar to those of European Pointillism, and Kibwanga produced paintings depicting fantastic and dramatic scenes, such as birds of prey with giant wings or fights between men and animals.

The establishment of another school of art around the 1950s was initiated by the French painter Pierre Lodz who took an interest in ethnology and dogs. Works of painters belonging to this school, such as the surrealist paintings of Jacques Zigoma and François Thango's ornamental-figurative pictures, are currently being exhibited in Freiberg.

== Square paintings from Tanzania ==
The farmer's son Eduardo Saidi Tingatinga made a living in Dar es Salaam by painting memories of his homeland. Using bicycle paint on 60×60cm hardboards he painted scenes of his village and surrounding animals and plants. Primarily assisted by his cousin January Linda, he sold the paintings at the local market. Later Linda took up painting himself. In 1971 Scandinavian development workers organized an exhibition of both Linda and Tingatinga in the National Museum of Dar es Salaam. The exhibition was such a success that it inspired a new generation of young artists, thus allowing Tingatinga's art to establish a whole artistic movement of its own, the Tingatinga-school. The exhibition in Freiberg displays mostly works from the early period of this trend in art, among those 13 works by Tingatinga himself.

== Ebony sculptures ==
The museum exhibits several artfully carved sculptures of ebony by Makonde artists. The Dance of the Shetani by Hossein Anangangola, an artwork of intertwined bodies, is especially elaborately and artfully crafted. The Slave Boat, probably a collaboration of unknown artists, is no less complex and artful. It is carved out of a massive trunk of an ebony tree and portrays African slaves and their Arabian prison guards on a boat. A similar work can be found in the collection in the granary of the nunnery of Heiligkreuztal. The Excited Man by Clementi Matei is an example of an abstract figure from the field of Makonde art.

== Paintings from Senegal ==
In Senegal, which became independent in 1960, the first president, Léopold Sédar Senghor, introduced an active cultural policy, which was intended to heal the negative effects of colonialism and promote a renaissance of African Art. Starting with the École des Arts de Dakar, founded in 1959, a vast spectrum of artistic activities came into being, which found expression in painting, graphics, sculptures and the manufacture of Gobelin. This officially promoted art particularly stressed the decorative element.

From 1980 onwards, after the era of Senghor, young artists found ways to express themselves more freely in visual language. Concerning this kind of art, one major form is reverse glass painting, which is called Souweres by the speakers of the Wolof language, adapted from the original French term sous verre. The exhibition at the Museum of Freiberg consists mainly of reverse glass paintings. The works of Souleymane Keita and Fodé Camara represent modern, abstract Senegalese art. The exhibition shows works which focus on the display of national narrative literature, such as fables and religious motives, disregarding the Islamic prohibition to visualize the latter. In Freiberg, the works of Gora M’Bengue and Alexis N’Gom represent this kind of art.

== Stone sculptures from Zimbabwe ==
Based on the foundation of the Rhodesian National Gallery in 1957 and the formation of the artist community at Tengenenge in 1966, stone sculpturing in Zimbabwe flourished from the 1960s onwards – the country's official cultural policy speaks of Zimbabwe stone sculptures. In 1971, a big exhibition at the Musée Rodin in Paris led to an international breakthrough for this kind of art. In Germany it was displayed for the first time in Palmengarten, Frankfurt, in 1994. One of the most frequently used materials in the Zimbabwean art of masonry is the dark green to black, usually smoothly polished serpentine.

== History ==
On August 14, 1957, a Volkswagen Beetle set out for a great Africa tour from Kirchheim am Neckar. The tour ran towards South through the western part of Africa to Cape of Good Hope and back through the East and lasted about a year. One of the two passengers was Arthur Benseler (1925-2011) from Freiberg am Neckar.

After this first journey Arthur Benseler went on further study visits and trips that lasted several months. These delivered an abundance of material which is why he decided to build a house for storing everything appropriately. This house – homestead of an Africa art collection, an Africa picture and music archive and an Africa library – was formed from 1969 to 1970. At that time Benseler himself did neither think of it as an act of founding nor was the name Africa House his invention, but it asserted itself in the local vernacular, so that it finally became an official term.

In the 1970s the Africa House became a center of African culture and adult education in the south-west of Germany. Not only exhibitions of African art but also concerts and seminars were organized here and it became a place where artists and other personalities from Africa met and exchanged their ideas. Between 1970 and 1995, about 150 seminars with about 20,000 participants took place in the Africa House.

The Africa House of Freiberg was one of the first places in Europe where one could listen to original African Kwela music: in 1972, the Kachamba Brother's Band from Malawi came to visit. They gave a concert with the ethnologist Prof. Gerhard Kubik, who is one of their band members, in the Nikolauschurch of Freiberg. The Makode exhibition of 1988 is especially worth mentioning among all the exhibitions that took place in the Africa House as afterwards it was shown in the “Musée national des Arts d'Afrique et d'Océanie” in Paris.

One famous visitor of the Africa House is Bishop Naumu from Cameroon, who himself is a musician and composer. He also came to get in touch with the Kachamca Brothers. The former ambassador of Ghana was so impressed by the Africa House that he decided to build a copy of it as his retirement home in his home country. Therefore, he received the architect's plans from Arthur Benseler.
