= Karl Wilhelm Friedrich von Breyer =

German historian (1771–1818)

Karl Wilhelm Friedrich von Breyer (29 September 1771, in Heutingsheim – 28 April 1818, in Munich) was a German historian.

== Biography ==
From 1789, he studied philosophy and theology at the Tübinger Stift in Tübingen, then from 1797 furthered his education at the University of Jena as a student of Johann Gottlieb Fichte. In 1803, he became an associate professor, and during the following year, was appointed professor of history and statistics at the University of Landshut. In 1807 he became a member of the Bavarian Academy of Sciences, and later on, a professor of history at the lyceum in Munich.

== Principal works ==
- Grundriss der Universalgeschichte, 1804 – Outline of universal history.
- Ueber den Begriff der Universalgeschichte, 1805 – On the concept of universal history.
- Beyträge zur Geschichte des dreysigjährigen Krieges, 1812 – On the history of the Thirty Years War.
- Grundriss der allgemeinen Geschichte in Tabellen für die studienschulen des Königreiches Baiern, 1820 – Outline of universal history tables for school studies in the Kingdom of Bavaria.
