= Freiberg am Neckar =

- Town
- Coat of arms

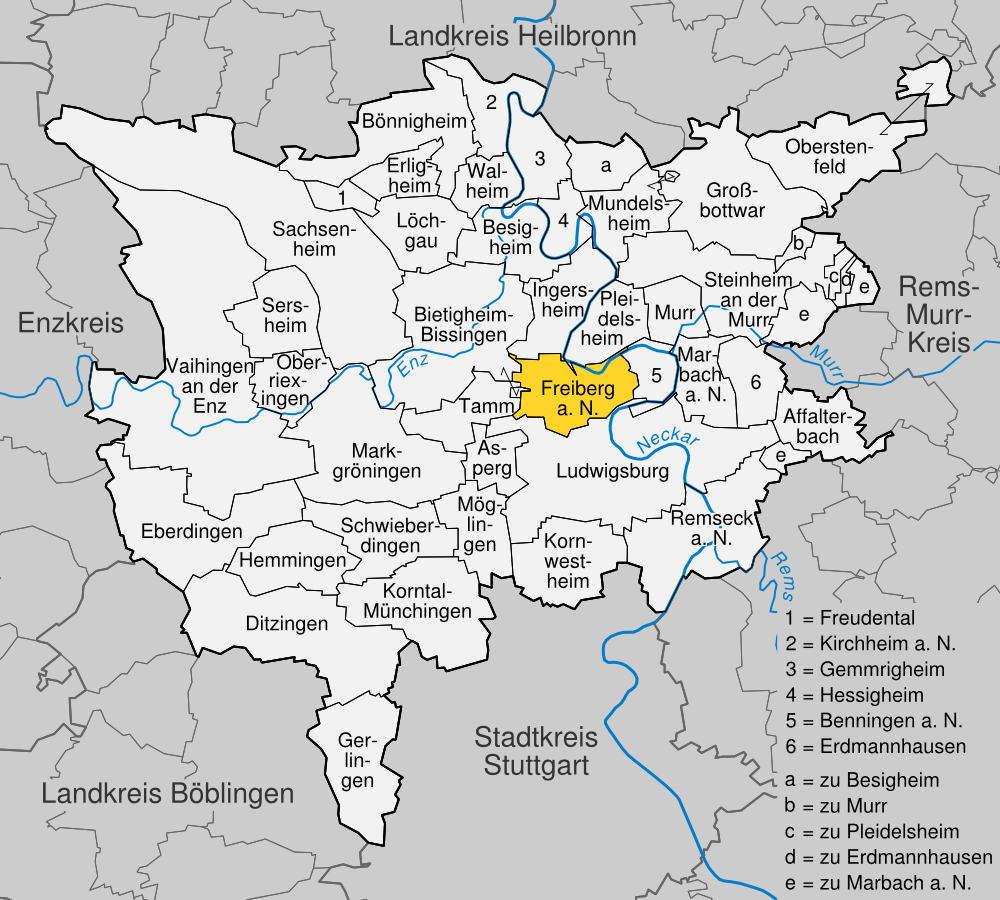
- Location of Freiberg am Neckar within Ludwigsburg district
- Interactive map of Freiberg am Neckar
- Location within Germany Location within Baden-Württemberg
- Coordinates: 48°56′N 9°12′E
- Country: Germany
- State: Baden-Württemberg
- Admin. region: Stuttgart
- District: Ludwigsburg

Government
  - Mayor (2024–32): Jan Hambach (SPD)

Area
  - Total: 13.14 km^{2} (5.07 sq mi)
- Elevation: 240 m (790 ft)

Population (2025-12-31)
  - Total: 15,482
  - Density: 1,178/km^{2} (3,052/sq mi)
- Time zone: UTC+01:00 (CET)
  - Summer (DST): UTC+02:00 (CEST)
- Postal codes: 71691
- Dialling codes: 07141
- Vehicle registration: LB
- Website: www.freiberg-an.de

Freiberg am Neckar (German pronunciation: [ˈfʁaɪ̯ˌbɛʁk ʔam ˈnɛkaʁ], lit. 'Freiberg on the Neckar') is a town in the district of Ludwigsburg, Baden-Württemberg, Germany. It is situated on the left bank of the Neckar, 18 km north of Stuttgart, and 4 km north of Ludwigsburg.

== Administrative structure ==
The town of Freiberg am Neckar consists of the three former independent villages of Beihingen am Neckar, Geisingen am Neckar and Heutingsheim. The former municipality of Beihingen am Neckar comprised Beihingen am Neckar village and the abandoned village of Bruderhaus. The former municipality of Heutingsheim consisted of Heutingsheim village and Haus Rosenau as well as the abandoned castle of Kasteneck.

== Location ==
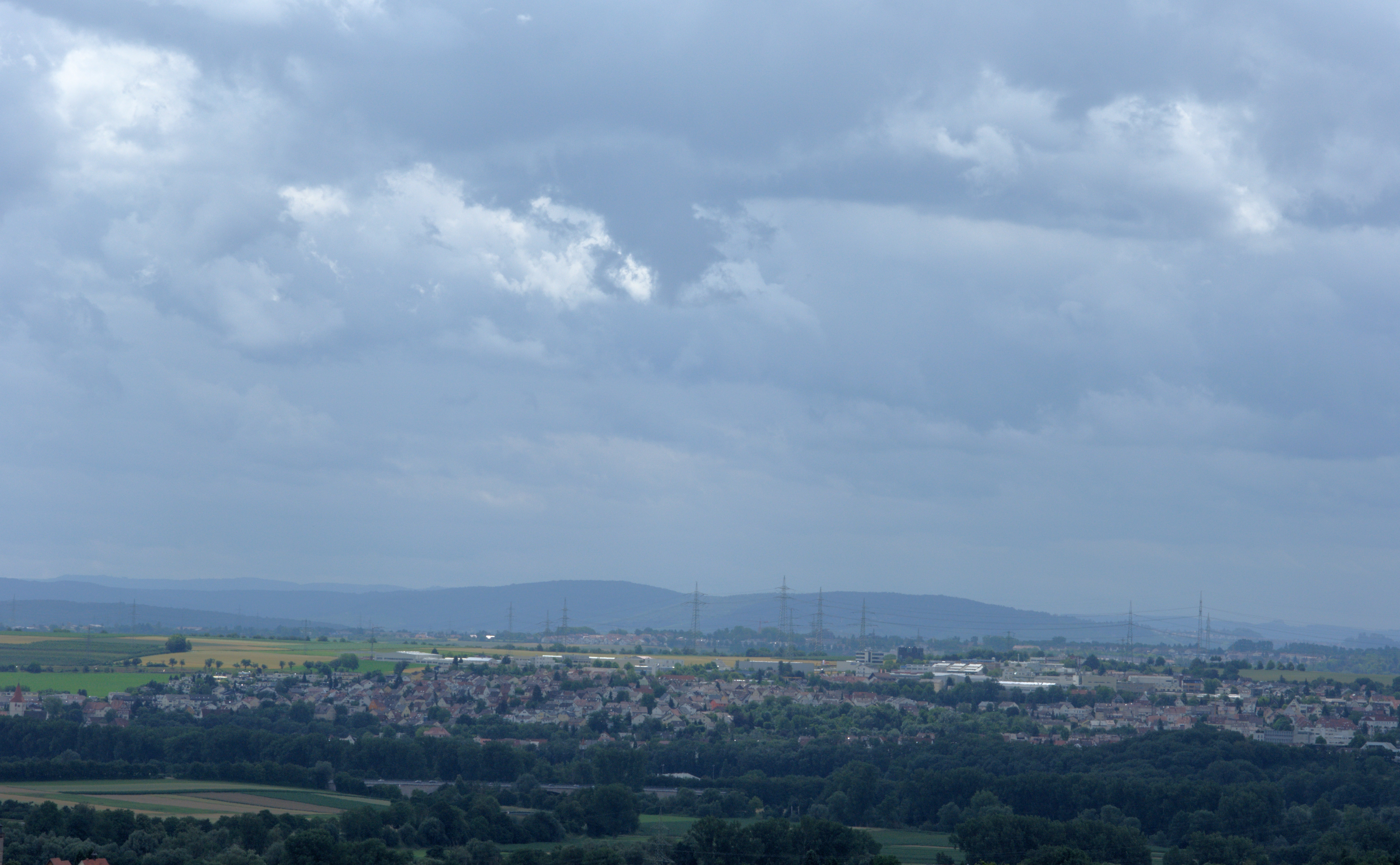
View from the north, down Ingersheim hills, upon Freiberg

Freiberg am Neckar lies between the bend in the River Neckar to the north of the town and the hill ranges to the south and west. It is a typical provincial town within the prosperous easily accessible periphery of a city region. The townscape shows residential areas with detached houses and small blocks of flats, as well as traffic areas and commercial areas. It is divided by the A 81 motorway.

The fertile silt soils in the hills around the town lend themselves to intensive agricultural exploitation, and farms are situated on the fields and orchards outside the urban areas. From the hills above the town there are wide panoramic views of the Neckar region, towards Hohenasperg and Stromberg, and the valleys and hills of the Murr and Bottwar region. These views are, however, somewhat spoilt by electricity pylons crossing the landscape that radiate from the electrical substation Ludwigsburg-Hoheneck.

== Municipal history ==
Freiberg am Neckar was created on 1 January 1972 by the voluntary association of the three originally agricultural communities of Beihingen am Neckar, Geisingen am Neckar and Heutingsheim. The town was given its charter on 1 January 1982.

The new name and coat of arms of the town was based on the family name of the hereditary barons of Freyberg, who held the castle and most of the parish of Beihingen from 1534 until 1569.

== Religion ==
After the Protestant Reformation, most of the population within the area of the modern town of Freiberg adhered to the Protestant faith as decreed by the rulers of Württemberg at the time. Thus in each of the three boroughs there is still a Protestant congregation. Since 1954, there has also been a Roman Catholic parish. In addition, there are Methodist, Mormon and New Apostolic communities. About 25.5% of the population is Catholic, and 44.5% are Protestants.

== Population statistics ==
In 1810, Beihingen had a population of 692, Heutingsheim 566, and Geisingen 438, adding up to a total population of 1,696. In 1900, the total population numbered 2,298 inhabitants, growing steadily from 3,322 in 1939 through 4,516 in 1950 and 11,749 in 1970 to more than 15,600 in 2007.

== Town council ==
The result of the council elections on 7 June 2009 was as follows (comparisons are with the previous election):

1. CDU 24.6% (-9,6): 6 seats (-2)
2. SPD 20.1% (+1,5): 5 seats (+1)
3. FW¹ 20.0% (-2,7): 4 seats (-1)
4. ULF² 15.5% (+1.9): 3 seats (±0)
5. OGL³ 13.4% (+2.5): 3 seats (+1)
6. FDP 6.4% (--): 1 seat (+1)

¹ Freie Wähler ("Free Voters"); ² Unabhängige Liste Freiberg ("Freiberg Independent List"); ³ Offene Grüne Liste ("Open Green List")

The next council elections are scheduled for 25 May 2014.

== Twin towns ==
- Soisy-sous-Montmorency (France)
- Erzin (Turkey)
- Roßwein (Saxony/Germany)
- Újhartyán (Hungary)

== Transport ==
Freiberg's rail link is the Backnang–Ludwigsburg railway, served by the S4 line (Backnang–Marbach–Stuttgart Schwabstraße) of the Stuttgart S-Bahn. The railway station, situated today within the Heutingsheim quarter, was opened in 1879 as Beihingen railway station and initially served the Backnang–Bietigheim line. Two years later, a branching feeder line to Ludwigsburg was added. When the town was chartered, the station was renamed "Freiberg (Neckar)" on 1 June 1975.

In 2011, the line via Marbach to Benningen was doubled. Currently, the station handles 1.4 million passengers per year.

The international Stuttgart Airport in Leinfelden-Echterdingen is about 45 km away.

== Local firms ==
About 600 small and medium-sized businesses are located at Freiberg am Neckar, among them an SAP branch office with 275 employees and a Porsche subsidiary with 475 employees.

== Viticulture ==
Freiberg am Neckar is a wine-growing town whose vineyards are part of the vineyard region of Schalkstein within the Württemberg Lowlands (Württembergisch Unterland) in the wine region of Württemberg.

== Public institutions ==
In 2001, the Prisma convention centre was opened near the town square. It is used as a venue for a wide variety of cultural and communal events. For music and theatre events for a smaller public the old castle wine press house opposite Beihingen Castle is still popular.

Next to the Oscar Paret School is the town library.

There is a retirement and nursing home.

A youth club uses the premises of Beihingen's old town hall, now under a preservation order.

== Education ==
Four types of secondary education school are based at the Oscar Paret School. It was the second comprehensive school in Baden-Württemberg. In 2008, it was among the finalists for the prestigious German school award Deutscher Schulpreis conferred by the Robert Bosch Stiftung. There are three primary schools, seven nursery schools, and one crèche.

== Museums ==
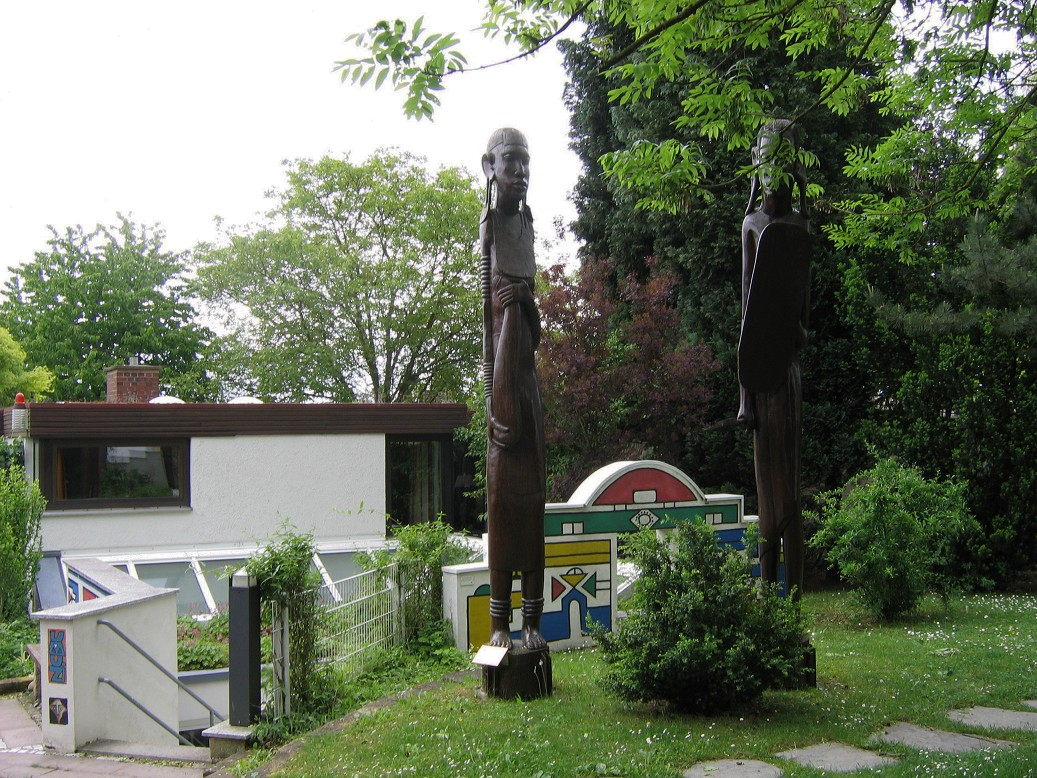
Africa House

Businessman Arthur Benseler (1925 – 2010) had a lifelong enthusiastic and active interest in African art and culture. He designed his private home from the outset as a centre for African art, music, and literature, such that over the years it became known as the Africa House. He bequeathed it to the town as a museum. The house and its grounds contain some 150 sculptures and pictures, some of which Arthur Benseler collected on his voyages over 30 years, while the rest have been added by the town of Freiberg.

The museum in Geisingen Manor (Museum im Schlössle) documents the historical development of Freiberg. Exhibits portray its early history from the first traces of human settlement through the history of the local territorial lords, the development of crafts, agriculture and industry as well as the local effects of war and other times of hardship. During Christmas there used to be an exhibition on springerle (a type of anise biscuit with an embossed design), however, during the last two years the museum's springerle moulds have been loaned to the Württemberg State Museum.

== Notable buildings ==
=== Beihingen borough ===
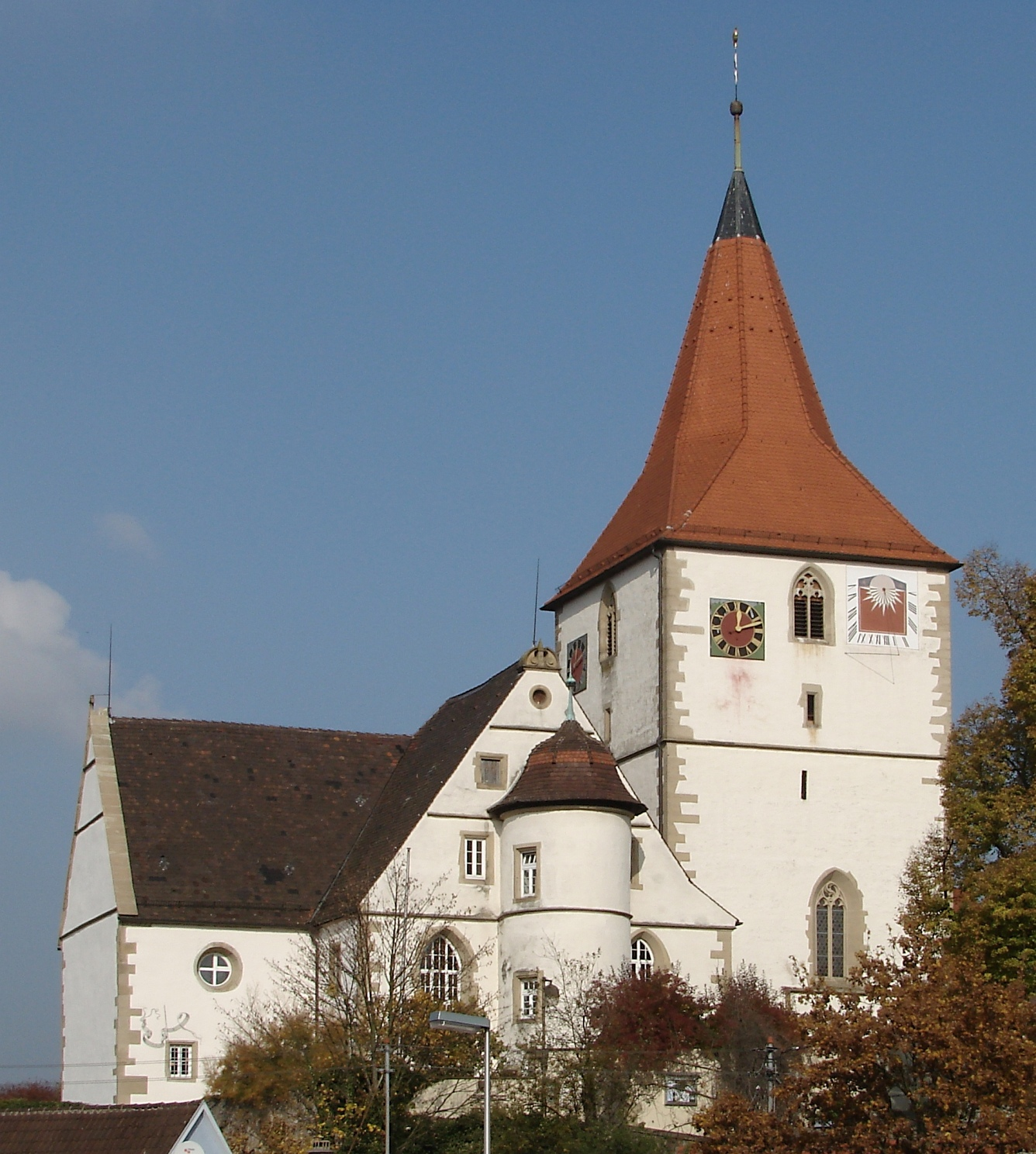
Amandus church at Freiberg-Beihingen

The Amandus Church, dating to the 16th century, was originally built as a fortress church. It is situated on a hill above the old village centre. It is remarkable for its architectural variety with elements of many epochs, its paintings, and the valuable 1766 organ.

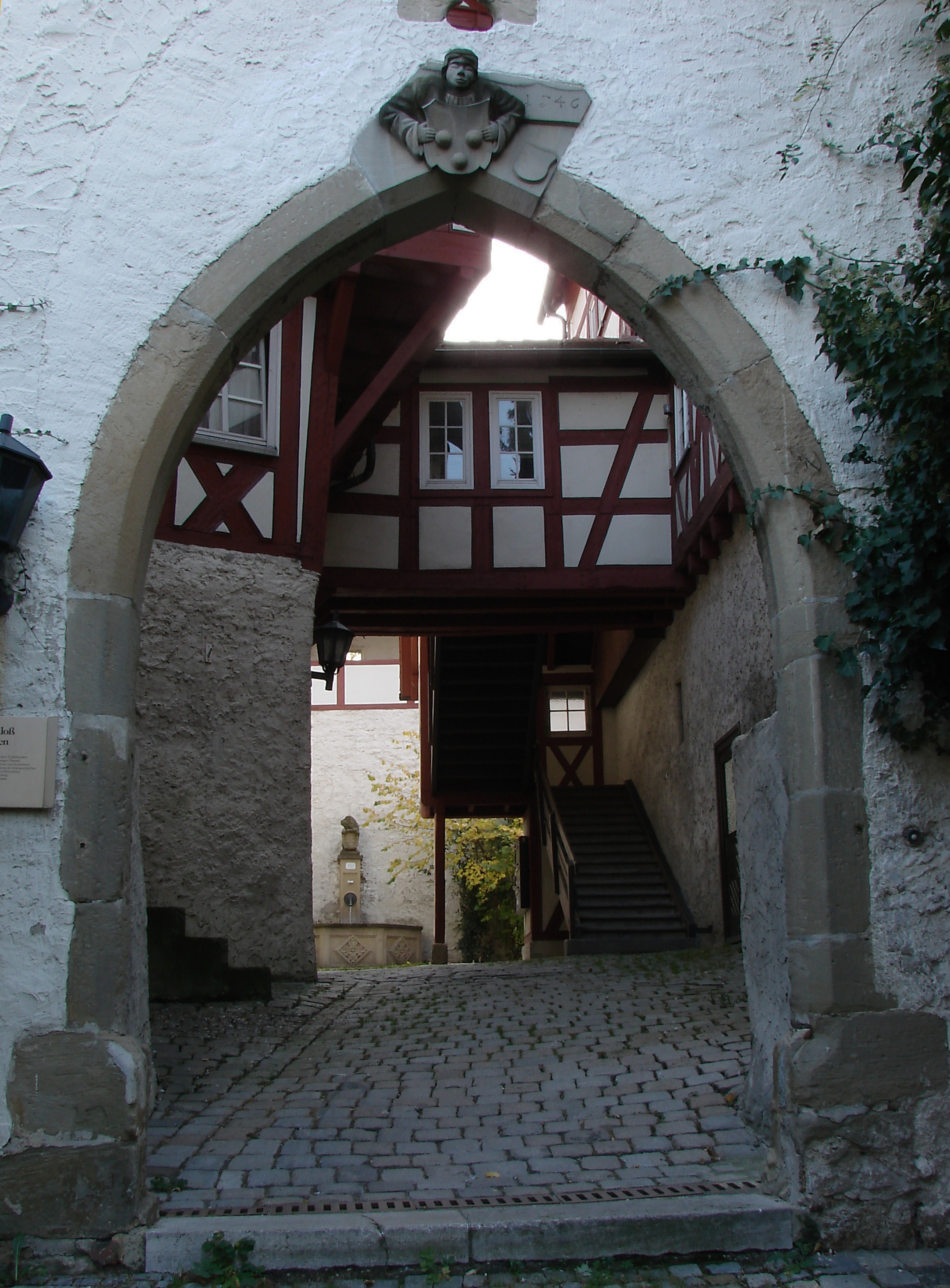
Old Castle at Beihingen, view into the interior court

Within sight of Amandus church lies the Old Castle of Beihingen, built by the hereditary barons of Nothaft and Gemmingen. The oldest part of the castle are the ruins of a 13th-century bergfried. The buildings still extant today were mostly erected in 1480 and 1680. Today it is occupied by archives and club houses.

The New Castle on the other side of the road was built in 1573 by Friedrich von Breitenbach and used ever since as a residence by a succession of aristocratic families. Today it is owned by the von Graevenitz family. Beside the three-storey main building from Ludwigsburger Straße can be seen the old tithe barn built in 1591; both buildings have been repainted as they were at the time of their construction.

In the vicinity of both castles lies the castle wine press house. It was rebuilt in 1730 on the site of an older press house from 1577. Since 1964 it has been owned by the town and used for cultural events.

Within the old village centre lies the old town hall from the 16th and 17th centuries, where Johann Friedrich Flattich was born. Also the old school house from 1776 still exists.

In the Neckar river lies the Beihingen weir, where the Neckar channel branches away from the abandoned course of the river.

=== Geisingen borough ===
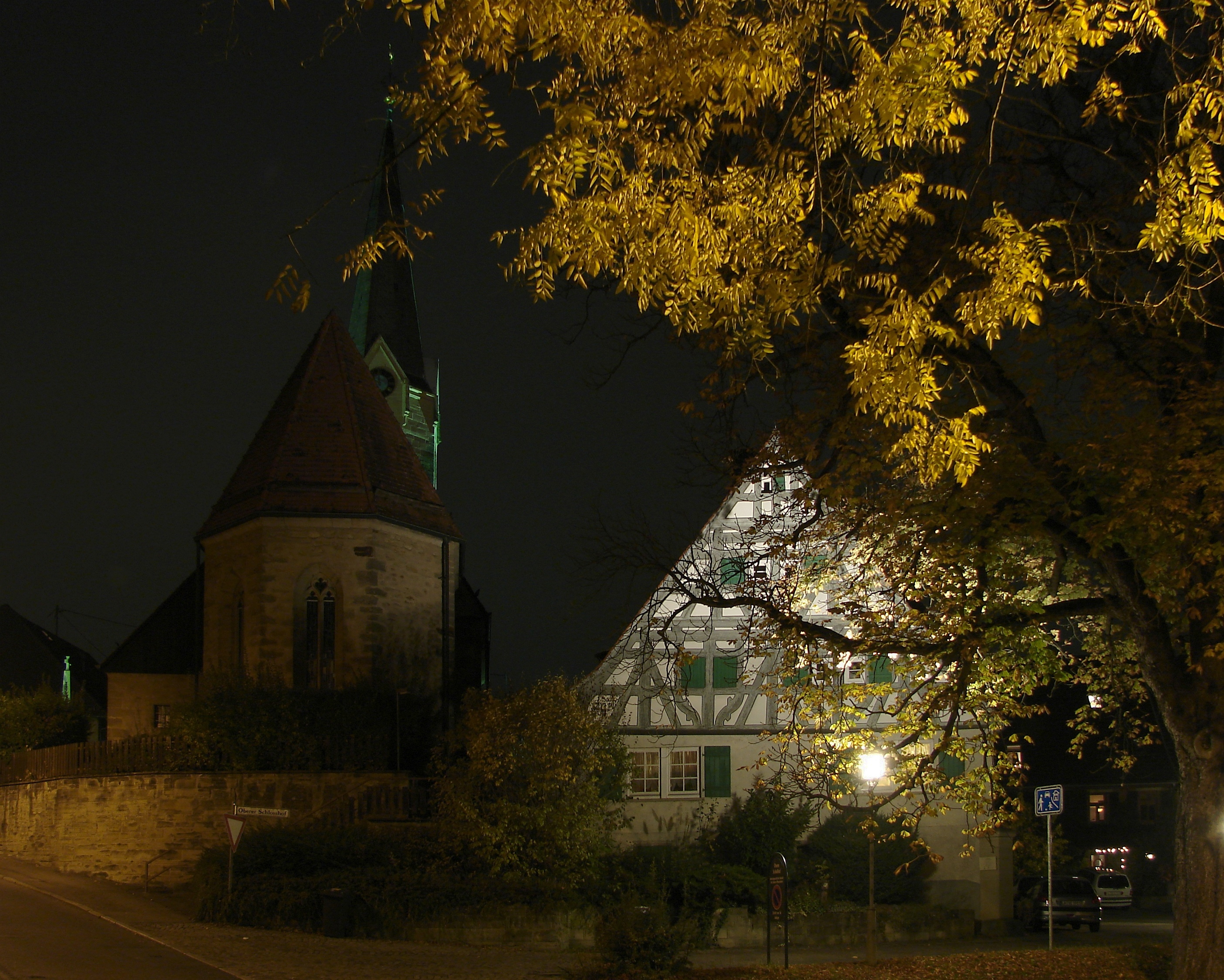
St. Nicolas church and outbuilding of the upper castle

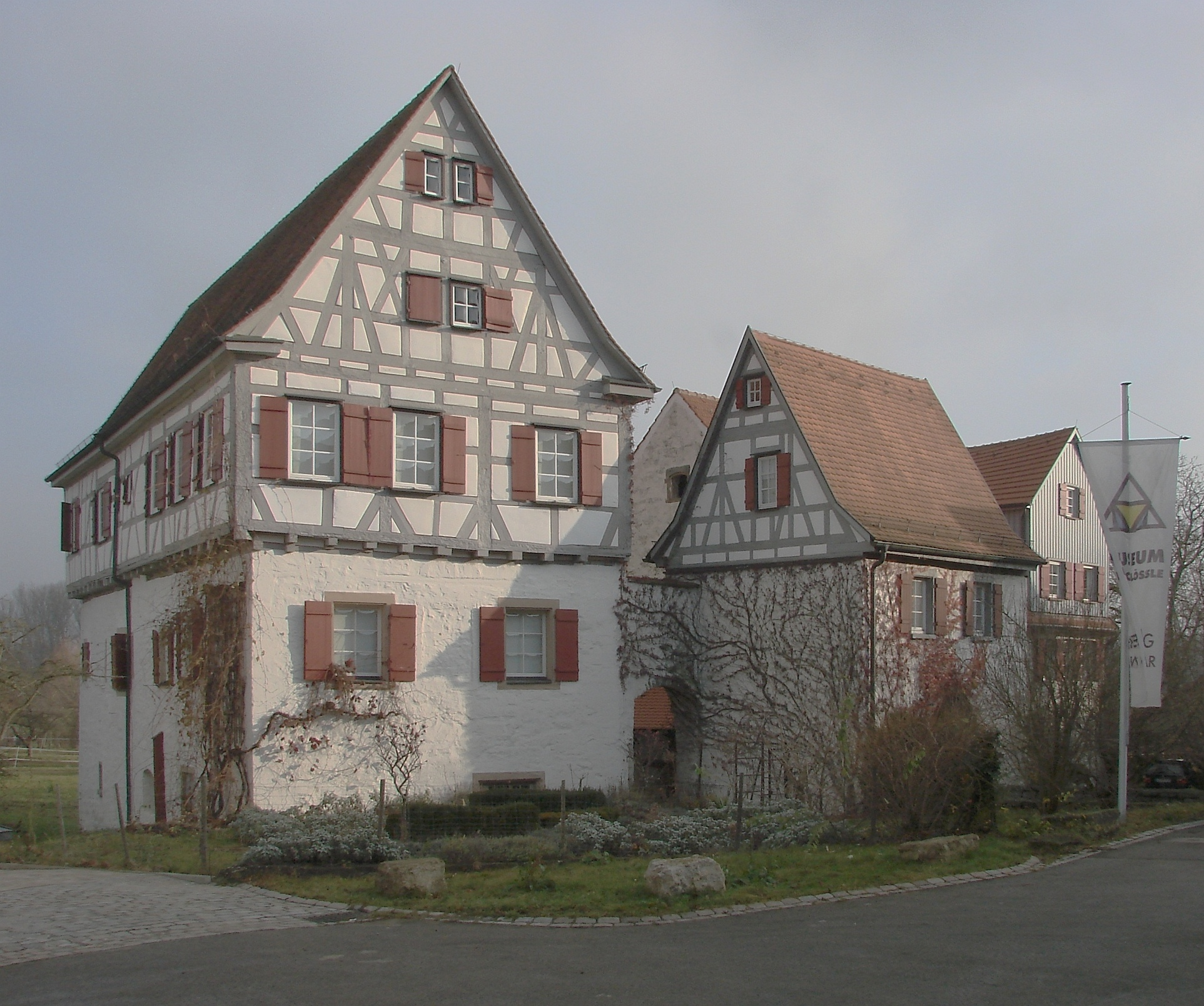
Geisingen Manor „Schlössle“ (lit.: „small castle“)

In Geisingen is found the St. Nicolas church built in the late Gothic style. At first in 1474 a chapel was built, which today serves as chancel. The main nave and the tower were added in 1521 and 1522. In 1900 the tower received its pointed roof replacing the former cap. In the interior of the church are the 16th-century tombstones of the former lords of the manor, the von Stammheim and Schertlin von Burtenbach families.

Immediately below the church lies the upper Geisingen castle or Kniestedt castle first mentioned near the end of the 16th century and rebuilt in 1723. Still a further 200 m further down, at the valley floor, lies the lower castle, the ancestral seat of the von Stammheim noble family, a former moated castle from 1486. The buildings as seen today, however, are all much younger; some have only been rebuilt in the 20th century modelled on their predecessor buildings on their former place. An extension building of the moated castle is the so-called "Schlössle" ("little castle" in the Swabian dialect), dated 1671. Further buildings from the 17th century within the farmyard of the lower castle are the old oil mill and the former wine press house.

=== Heutingsheim borough ===
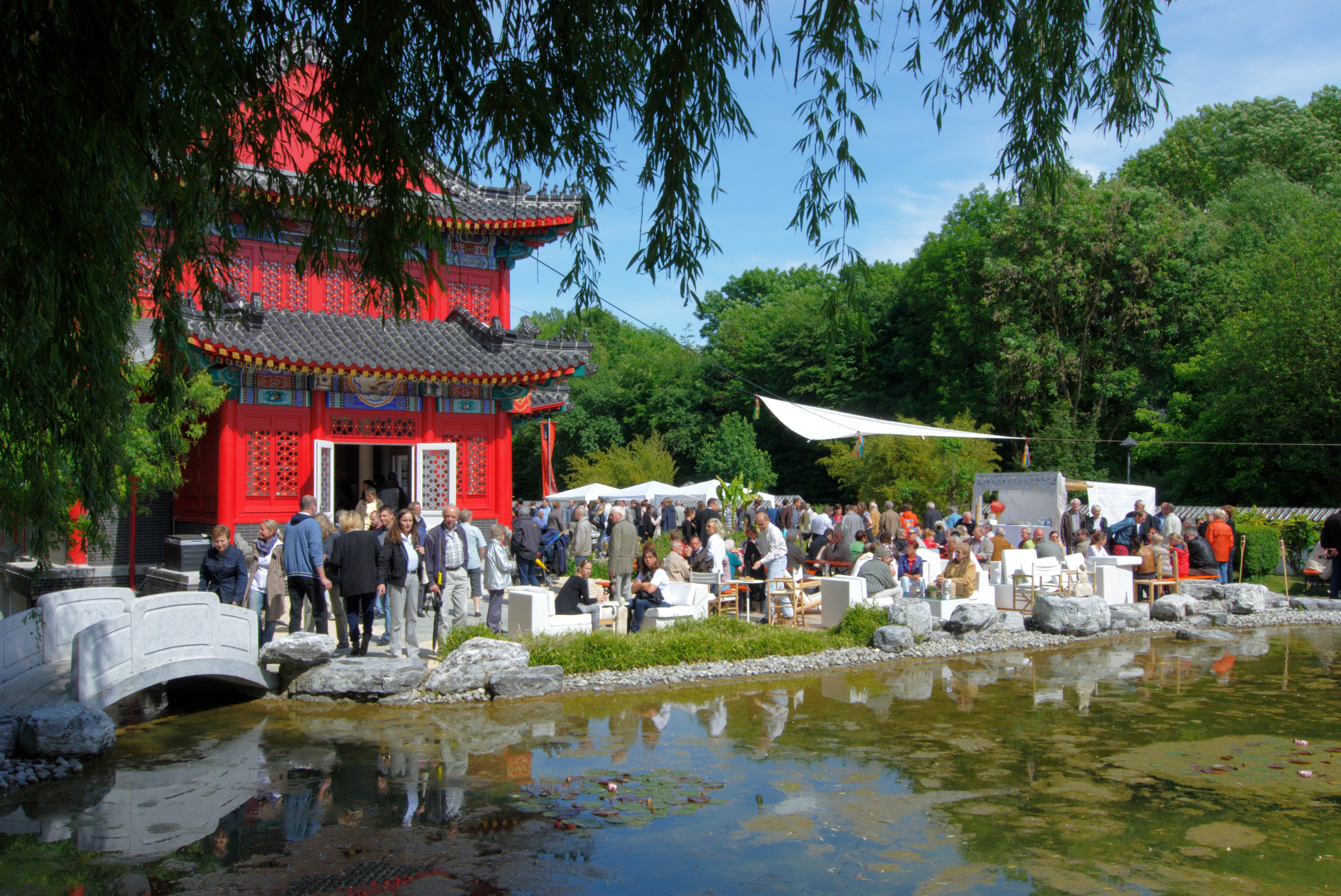
Reopening of the China house on 15 May 2011

At the town's exit towards Ludwigsburg-Eglosheim lies the largest original Chinese house in Europe. It is surrounded by a garden open to the public designed following taoist principles. House and garden were built following the terrain improvement in 1994 by the Chinese Dashi-Enterprise Group by Chinese builders and craftsmen. All building material was specially brought in from China. After opening in 1995 it served as German-Chinese centre as well as restaurant. In 2007 the house was abandoned after the operator had filed for bankruptcy in summer 2006 and remained unoccupied. In 2008 building and garden were closed to the public due to risk of collapse. In November 2008 the district court at Stuttgart decided that the bankrupt operator had to return the property to the town. In May 2010 the restoration works began. The new owner, Ming Ze Schaumann, again had specifically employed Chinese craftsmen. At 15. May 2011 the renovated China House was officially reopened.

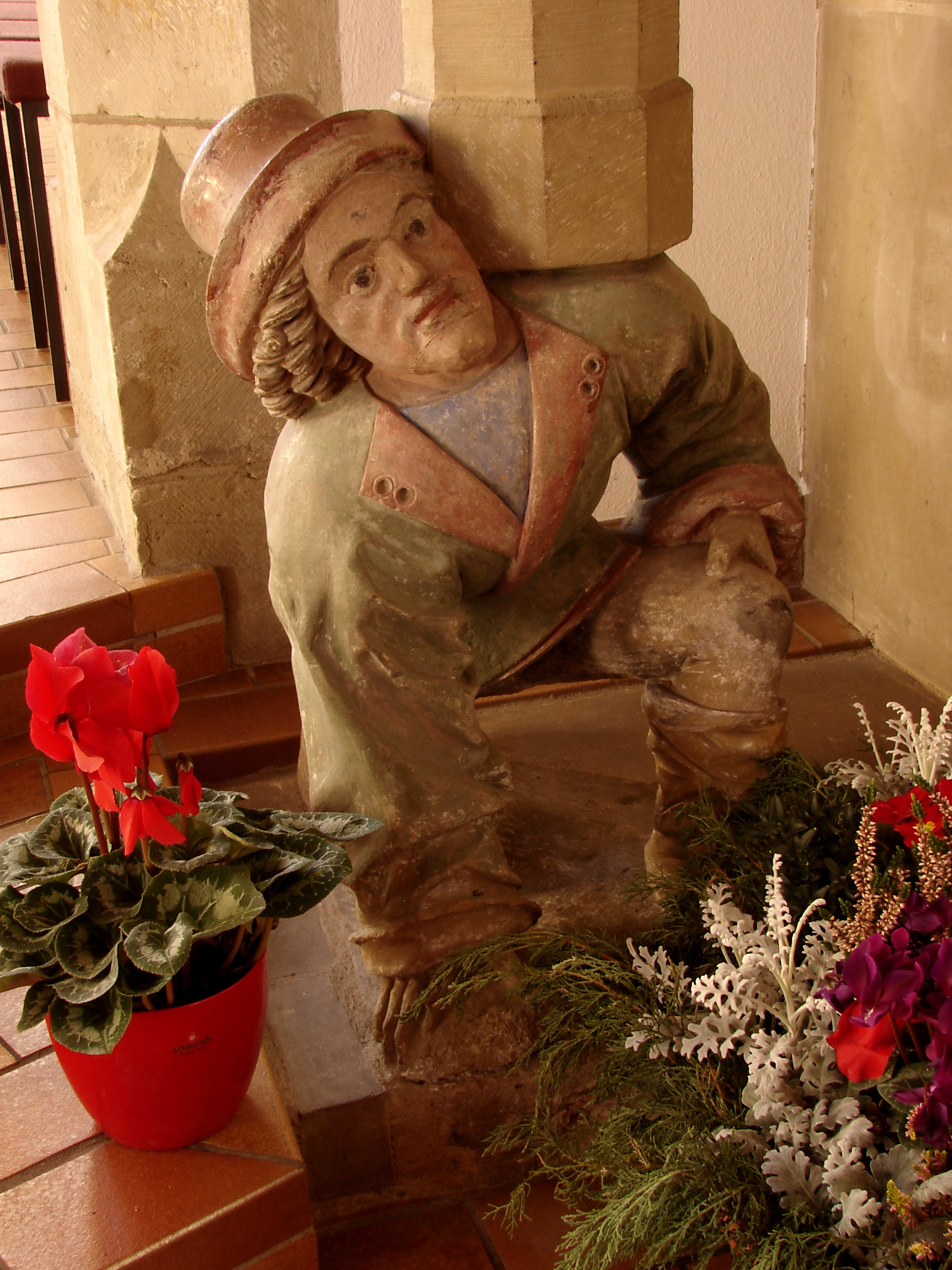
The pulpit bearer within the church St. Simon and Jude

At the centre of the former village of Heutingsheim was the townhall built in 1781 in the classicistic style within a warren of narrow alleys and side streets. The Protestant parochial church St. Simon and Jude, a late gothic west tower church from 1487, has a beautifully sculpted chancel with a ribbed vaulting. The headstones show the biblical apostles Simon and Jude (Thaddeus) and Mary with the Child as Queen of Heaven. The pulpit rests on a stone sculpture: the pulpit bearer, a kneeling man, created by Anton Pilgram, bears it upon his shoulders. The big clock in the tower inscribed Osanna dates from 1492.

Heutingsheim too has its castle. The building complex erected around 1700 with its manor and triple-winged outhouse is delimited towards the street by a castle wall. It is a typical example of a country manor of a minor noble family from that time. Untypical for the region, however, are the Low German elements in the timber-framed gables of the outhouse as seen from the road.

== Nature preservation ==
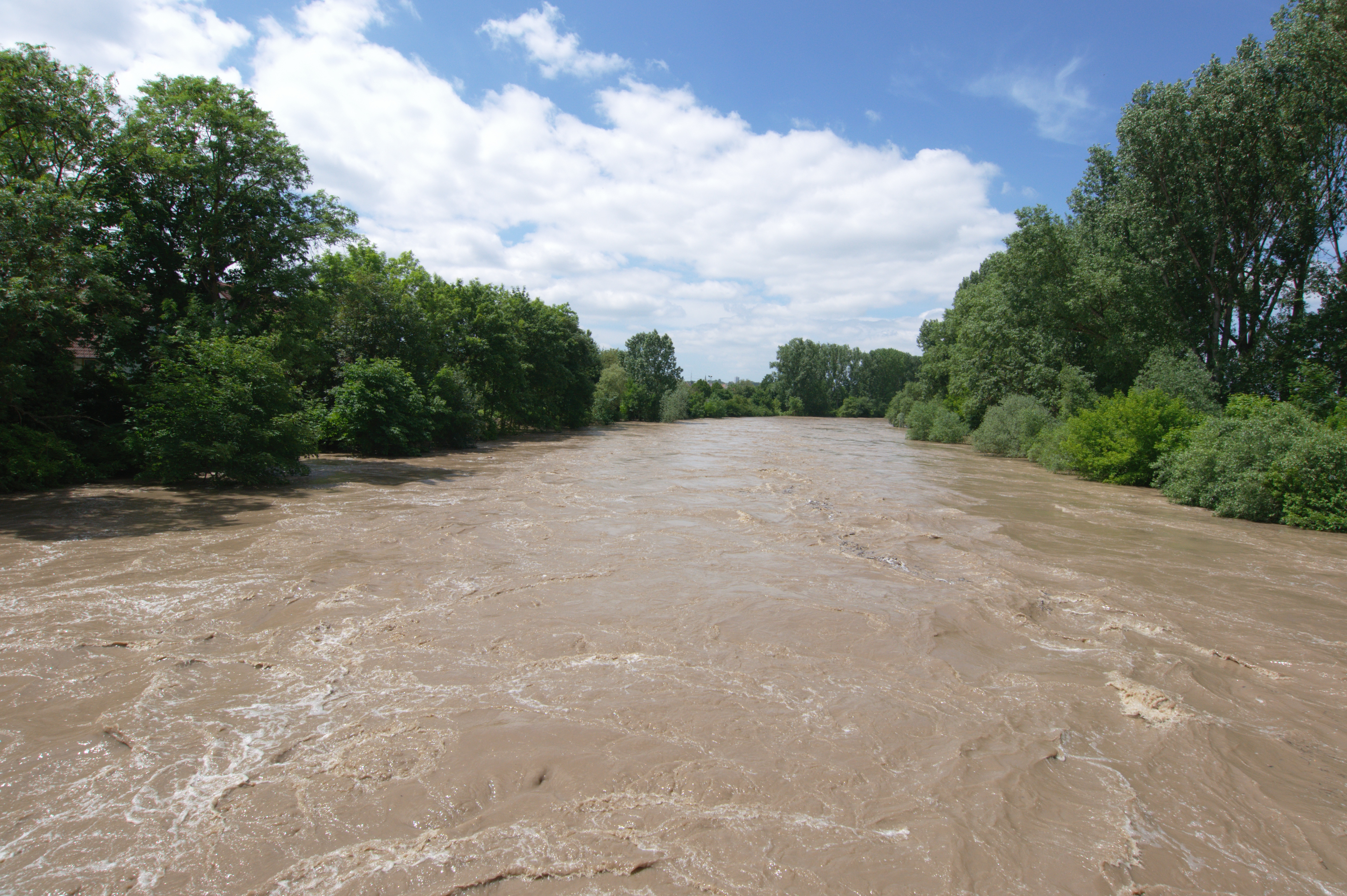
Flood in the nature sanctuary Altneckar

The nature reserve Altneckar with its riparian forest and the adjacent grassland valley is an idyllic local recreational area and ecological oasis between the townships of Freiberg, Pleidelsheim, and Ingersheim. On the near side of the A 81 motorway the high railway embankment of the former railway line from Backnang to Bietigheim is protected and cared for by the town and the local committee of the BUND ("Union for the environment and nature conservation Germany") as a dry biotope. On the far side of A 81 the railway line cut a deep rut into the landscape. By the joint efforts of the town and the BUND there too a protective area was created, in the occurrence a dark moist wood biotope. The railway bridge crossing the A 81 had been destroyed on 20. April 1945 by retreating German forces. After World War II the bridge was not rebuilt and the railway line abandoned.

== Notable residents ==
- Johann Friedrich Flattich (1713–1797), Protestant minister and educator, born at the borough of Beihingen.
- Karl Wilhelm Friedrich von Breyer (1771–1818), historian, born in Heutingsheim.
- Oscar Paret, (1889–1972), archeologist and local historian, grew up in the borough of Heutingsheim.
- SS-Obersturmbannführer Erich Kempka (16 September 1910 – 24 January 1975) served as Adolf Hitler's primary chauffeur from 1934 to April, 1945.

== Literature ==
- Ulrich Gräf (1986), Kunst- und Kulturdenkmale im Kreis Ludwigsburg (in German), Stuttgart: Theiss, pp. 102–114, ISBN 3-8062-0466-7
