= Oscar Paret =

German archaeologist (1889–1972)

Oscar Paret (born 14 June 1889 in Dachtel, Böblingen district; died 27 June 1972 in Ludwigsburg) was a German archaeologist. From 1949 to 1954, he served as state conservator of Baden-Württemberg.

== Life ==
Oscar Paret grew up as the second child of pastor Otto Paret and his wife Edine, née Wolff, first in Dachtel, then from 1892 in the Heutingsheim rectory, together with three sisters and two brothers. Heutingsheim is now a district of the town of Freiberg am Neckar (Ludwigsburg district in Baden-Württemberg). Paret's interest in archaeology and local history developed during his early childhood. At the age of 13, he wrote treatises about his hometown of Heutingsheim and about Geisingen. At 14, he founded an antiquarian society and a collection.

In 1907, while attending the Friedrich-Eugen-Oberrealschule in Stuttgart, he met Peter Goessler, then director of the Stuttgart Antiquities Collection, when Goessler was researching the foundation walls of the Villa Rustica in Heutingsheim.

Paret conducted his first excavations in 1908. That autumn, he began studying architecture at the Technical University of Stuttgart. In autumn 1912, he pursued archaeology and ancient history in Tübingen and Berlin, studies interrupted in 1914 by the outbreak of the First World War. During this time, he was briefly appointed by the Ministry of Culture as honorary deputy to the conservator Goessler, who was residing in Greece. In 1911, Karl von Ostertag-Siegle commissioned him to conduct scientific research on the "Eglosheim Castle" near Ludwigsburg-Hoheneck.

In July 1919, Paret received his doctorate in Tübingen with a thesis on wall paintings in Pompeii. In August of the same year, he became an assistant and curator at the Landesmuseum, initially under Eugen Gradmann, then under Peter Goessler. In 1930, Walther Veeck was appointed director of the antiquities collection. Paret was drafted again during the Second World War. After Veeck's death in February 1941, Paret assumed his duties, overseeing the relocation and care of the antiquities collection and the Ludwigsburg Local History Museum during the bombing raids.

In December 1945, Paret submitted a 15-point questionnaire to the Ludwigsburg District Cultural Council, proposing that the events of the Second World War be documented. The questions later formed the basis for municipal reports on the events of 1945 and the extent of destruction during the war.

When the Württemberg State Museum was re-established in 1947, Paret was entrusted with managing the prehistoric and early history collections and archaeological monument preservation. The Technical University of Stuttgart appointed him an honorary professor in 1948.

Until his retirement in 1954, Paret advanced the comprehensive documentation and presentation of collections and numerous new finds in the archives and museum. Several local history museums in the state also owe their existence to his initiative.

== Honours ==
- Ludwigsburg Citizen's Medal (1959)
