= Amandus Church (Freiberg am Neckar) =

Village church in Baden-Württemberg, Germany

Coordinates: 48°56′15″N 09°12′18″E

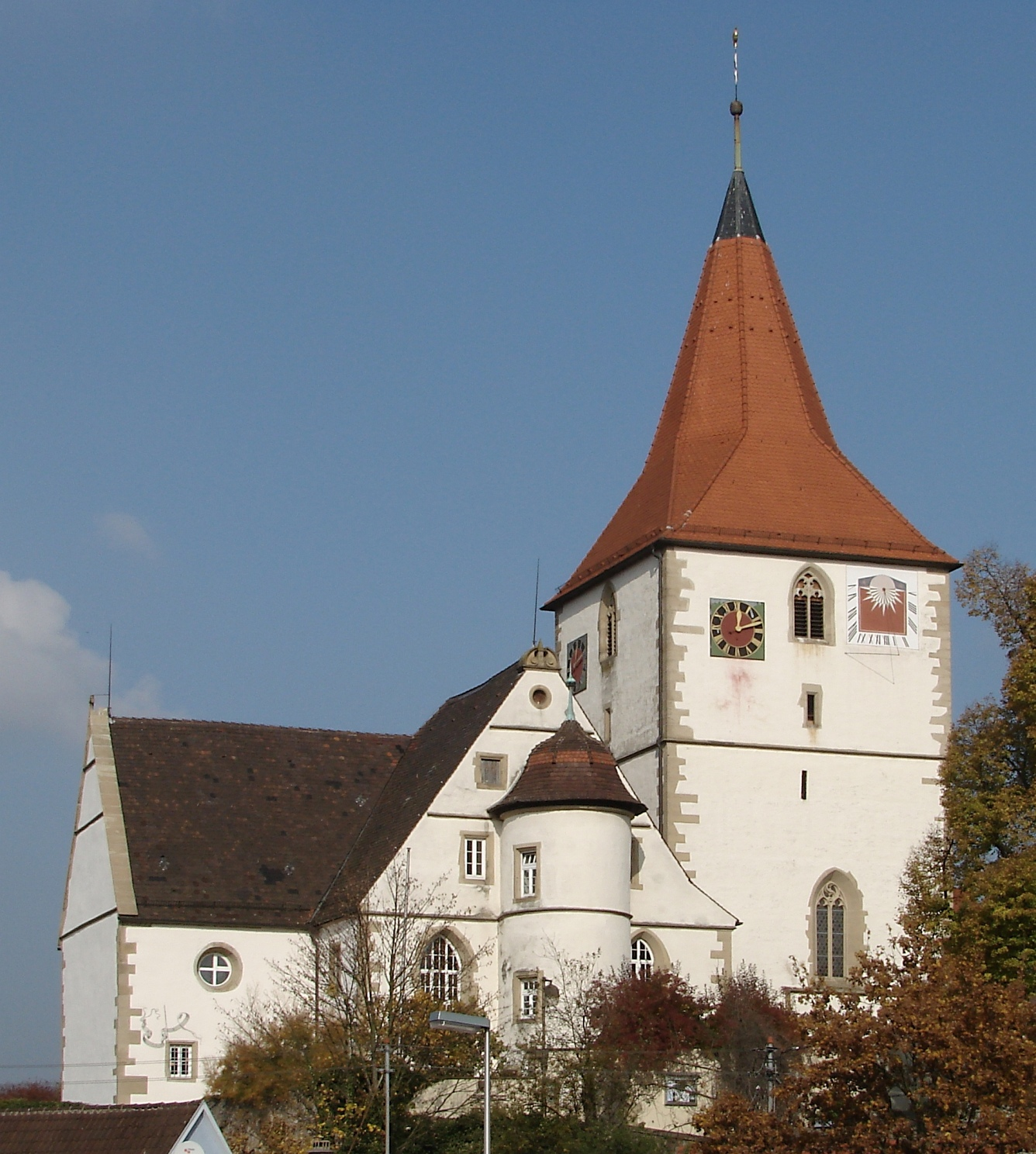
Amandus Church

The Protestant Amandus Church in Freiberg am Neckar, Germany, is a late Gothic fortified former village church. Apart from the collegiate church in Bad Urach it is the only church of that name in Baden-Württemberg. Situated on a hill above the old village centre, it is notable for a diversity of architectural styles and for its paintings and organ.

== History ==
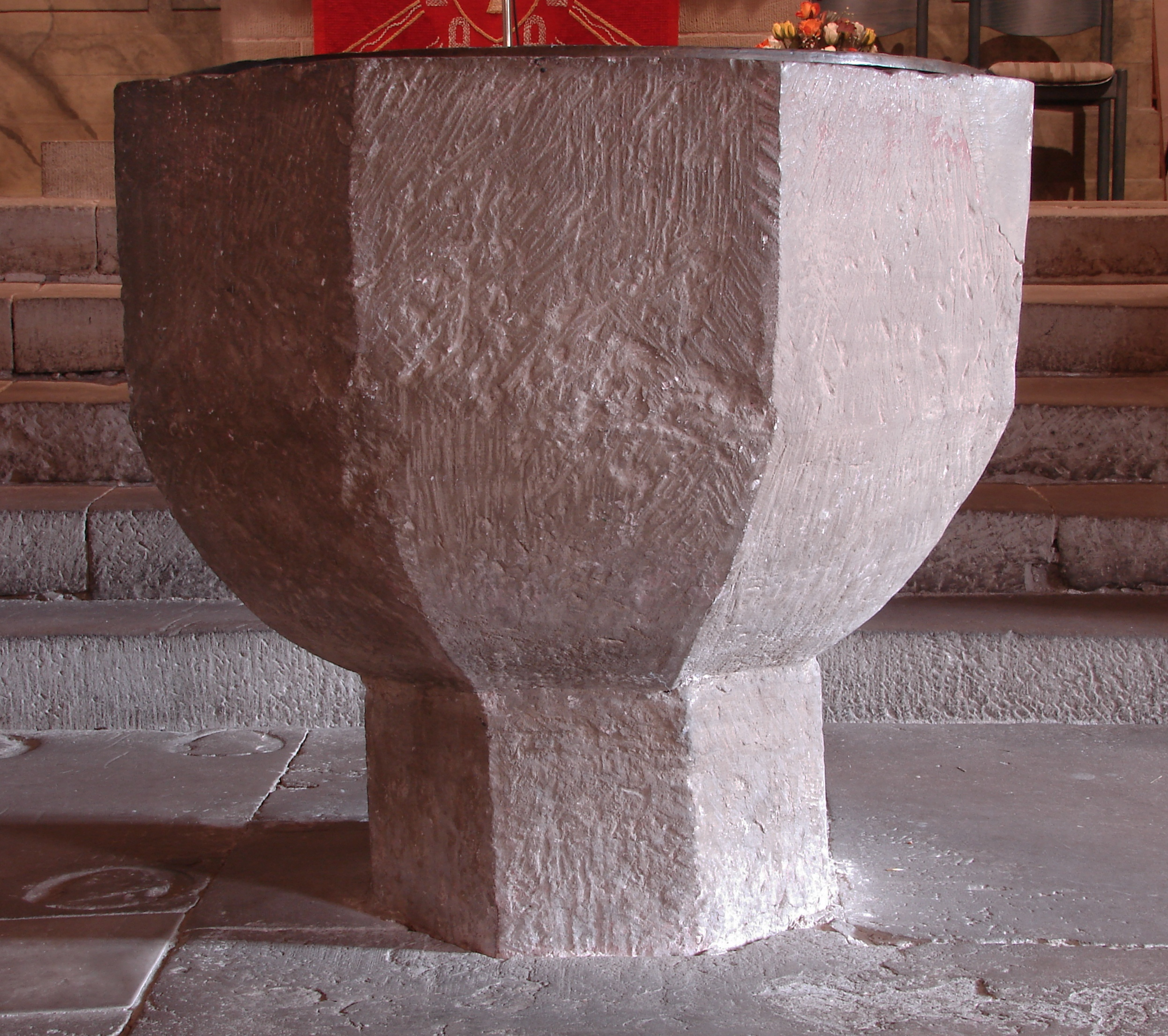
Medieval font

The first mention of a church at this place dates from 844. In 1338 and 1486 Mary was named as altar patroness. The foundation walls of the massive choir tower date from the late Romanesque or early Gothic period. The chancel, the choir tower with its embrasures and the oldest part of the nave were probably not built until after 1450, despite the early Gothic impression created by the chancel arch. The style periods out in the country often follow those of a region's main cultural centres. According to a headstone text on the south wall, in 1500 a chapel which no longer survives was added by the Mainz canon Peter Nothaft who originated from here. The tracery windows as well as the expressive crucifix on the altar also date from the late Gothic period.

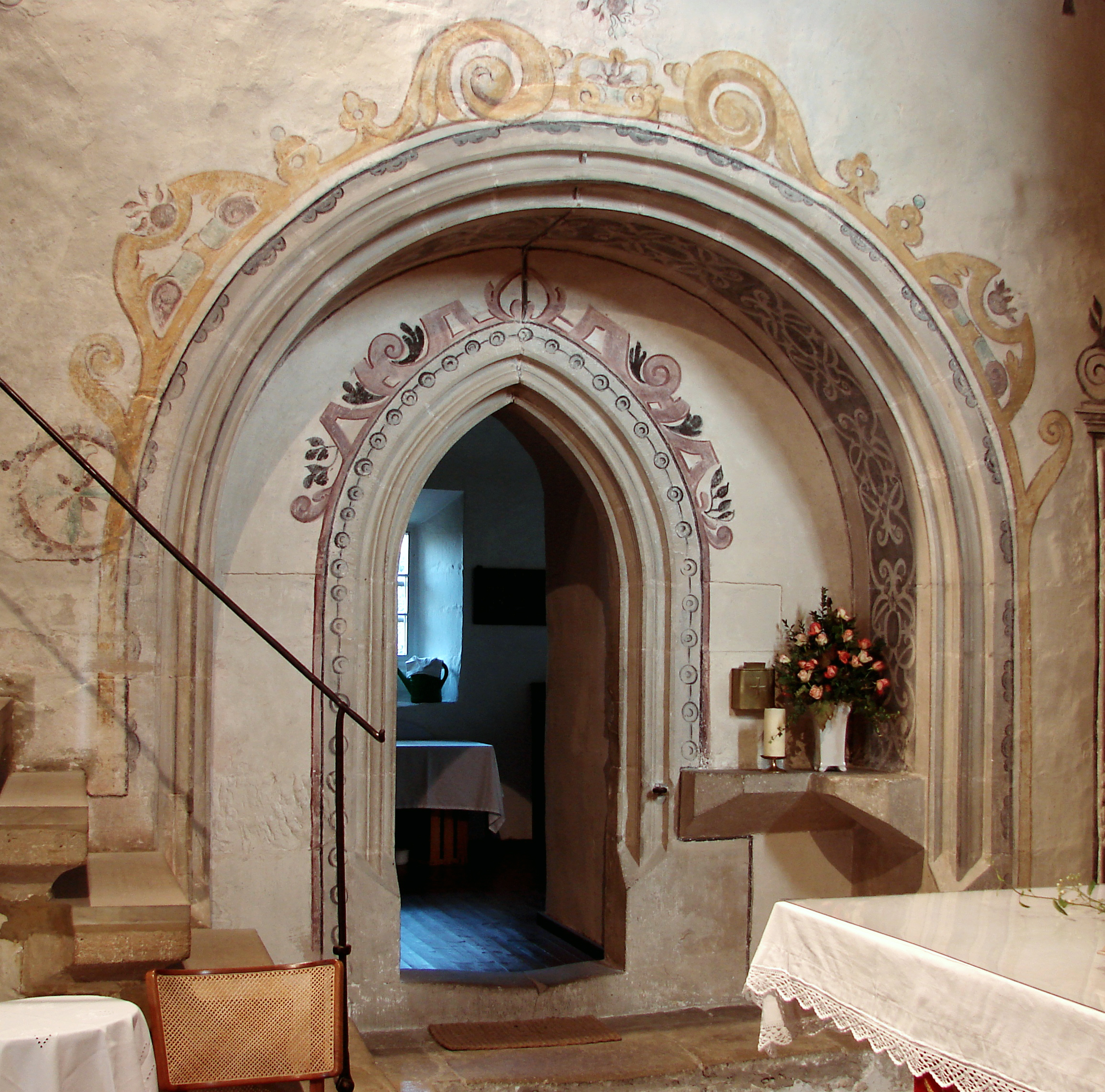
Entrance to the sacristy with Renaissance ornamental imagery

In 1590, the rectory still in use today was built behind the north wall of the church. In 1596, the entire chancel was painted with murals by the artist Jörg Herzog from Markgröningen. The murals in the nave also date from this period. In 1597 and 1607, it was reported that the cemetery could no longer accommodate the victims of the plague. As a result, in 1610 the cemetery still in use today to the east of the church was built. In 1620, a southern transept with a large gallery was added, presumably at the cost of the chapel built in 1500. Around the same time, the round tower on the south side was erected as a stairwell for the manorial lords of Beihingen. During the wars of the 17th century, i.e. the Thirty Years' War and the War of the Palatine Succession, the church lost its windows, stalls, pulpit, and the bells installed in 1631.

In the following period these losses were compensated and the church further expanded. In 1699 the abat-voix was built, and only then, following models at Ludwigsburg built at the same time, was the pulpit added below. That year the church also received its first organ. In 1703, a stucco ceiling was completed in the south nave. In 1706 the bells were replaced. In 1737, extensions were made to accommodate the growing population. On the north wall the large wooden gallery for the men of the parish was erected, together with a specially constructed outer staircase with its own stone gateway.

In the 18th century, the church was embellished in the Rococo style. The Gothic ceiling, door and window embrasures and the rector's stall were painted with ornamental imagery (German: Bandelwerk). The same artist, Hans Stiegler, painted the oils on the gallery balustrades. In 1766 the church received the organ, whose casing is preserved to this day.

In 1958 the church underwent comprehensive restoration which revealed murals painted in medieval times and about 1600 which had been whitewashed over. Most could be recovered in subsequent years. The little altar before the organ was replaced in 1960 by a stone altar where the Gothic crucifix was placed. In 1981 the organ pipes were renewed, while the casing was preserved.

== Architecture ==
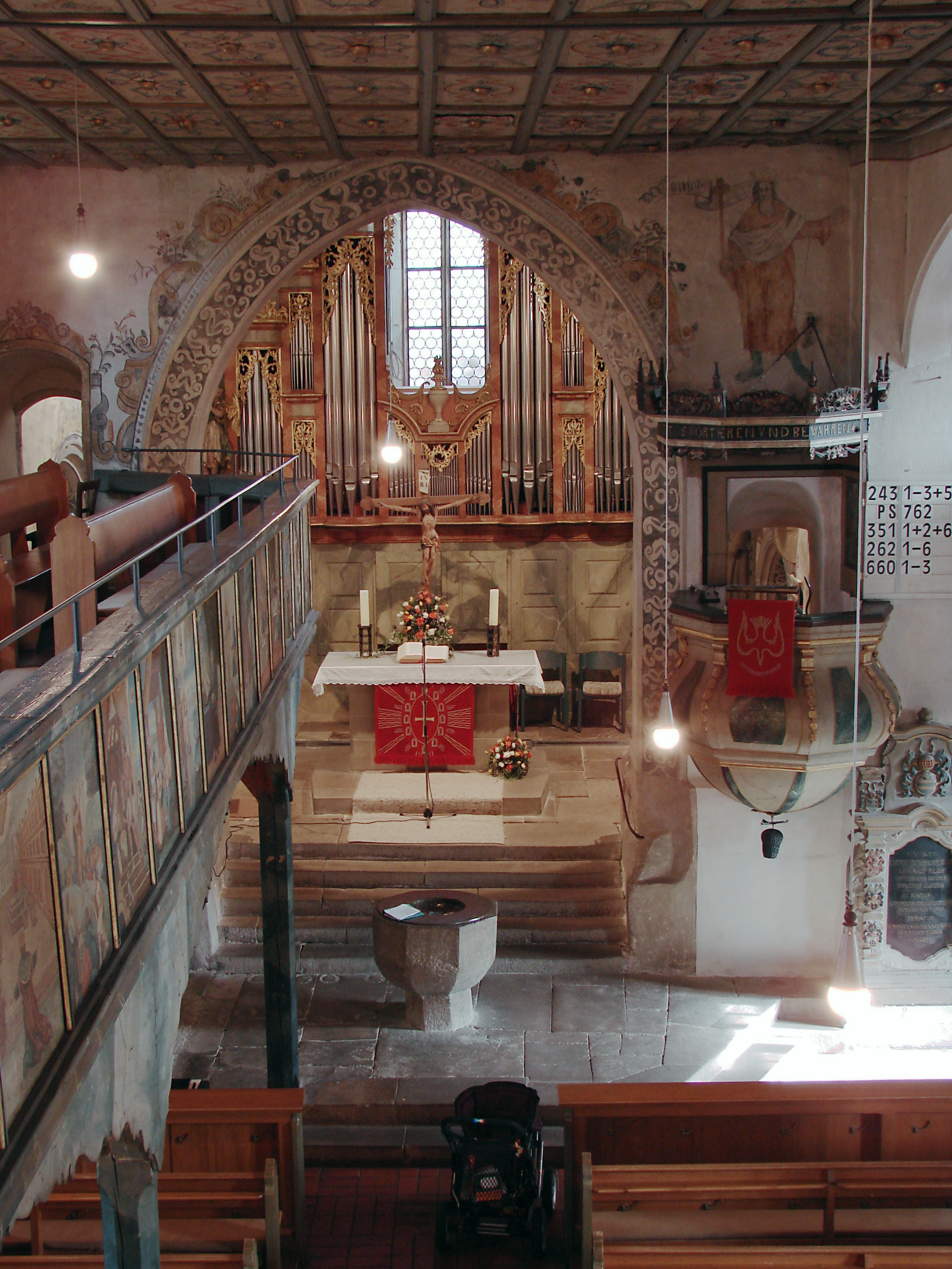
View from the rear gallery through the main nave and chancel

With the various additions, furnishings and fixtures the church appears contorted, buoyant and contrastive. The massive, austere Gothic style chancel tower is in peculiar contrast to the main structure, which with its added southern nave and the adjoining semicircular stairwell tower gives the impression of a buoyant Renaissance castle. Nevertheless, the structure as a whole is harmonious. Ornamental elements which recur in various parts of the building include the window designs, the unplastered stones forming the building ledges and the wraparound storey decorations make for a coherent structure. The bright white exterior and the exposed position of the church enhance the building itself while contributing to its appearance as an integral unit.

Next to the entrance, there is an unusually large tower room (in proportion to the church as a whole). It looks almost as if there is a second storey. In contrast, the chancel bears a classic tower as found in many churches in southern Germany. A Gothic chancel arch much narrower than the body of the church separates the chancel from the nave. The southern nave too is conspicuously segregated from the main nave. Between two round arches, a column decorated with coloured plaster bears the weight of the ceiling between the main and lateral naves. The chancel and the altar cannot be seen from some of the seats in the lateral nave. The richly ornamented Baroque pulpit with its abat-voix can however be seen from almost all seats.

== Frescos and paintings ==
The east wall of the church bears a large colourful medieval fresco showing a scene of the Resurrection. It was discovered during the 1958 restoration.

The coffered ceiling and the two transoms were first painted in the Middle Ages. Traces can still be seen underneath Hans Stiegler's ornamental Rococo decorations. The panels were also originally decorated with golden hemispheres.

The most striking embellishments are Stiegler's oils covering the whole length of the gallery balustrades. On the manorial gallery to the south they show Christ, the twelve apostles and the four evangelists. On the men's gallery biblical history from the Creation to the Last Judgment and the Trinity is depicted consecutively along the west and north sides.

The Renaissance painting by Jörg Herzog in the chancel above the entrance to the vestry shows the creation of man in paradise and the story of Cain and Abel. To the left of the eastern chancel window, Moses with the ten commandments is depicted, while his brother Aaron is portrayed to the right of the window. The painting of the Creation on the chancel side of the triumphal arch could not be restored.

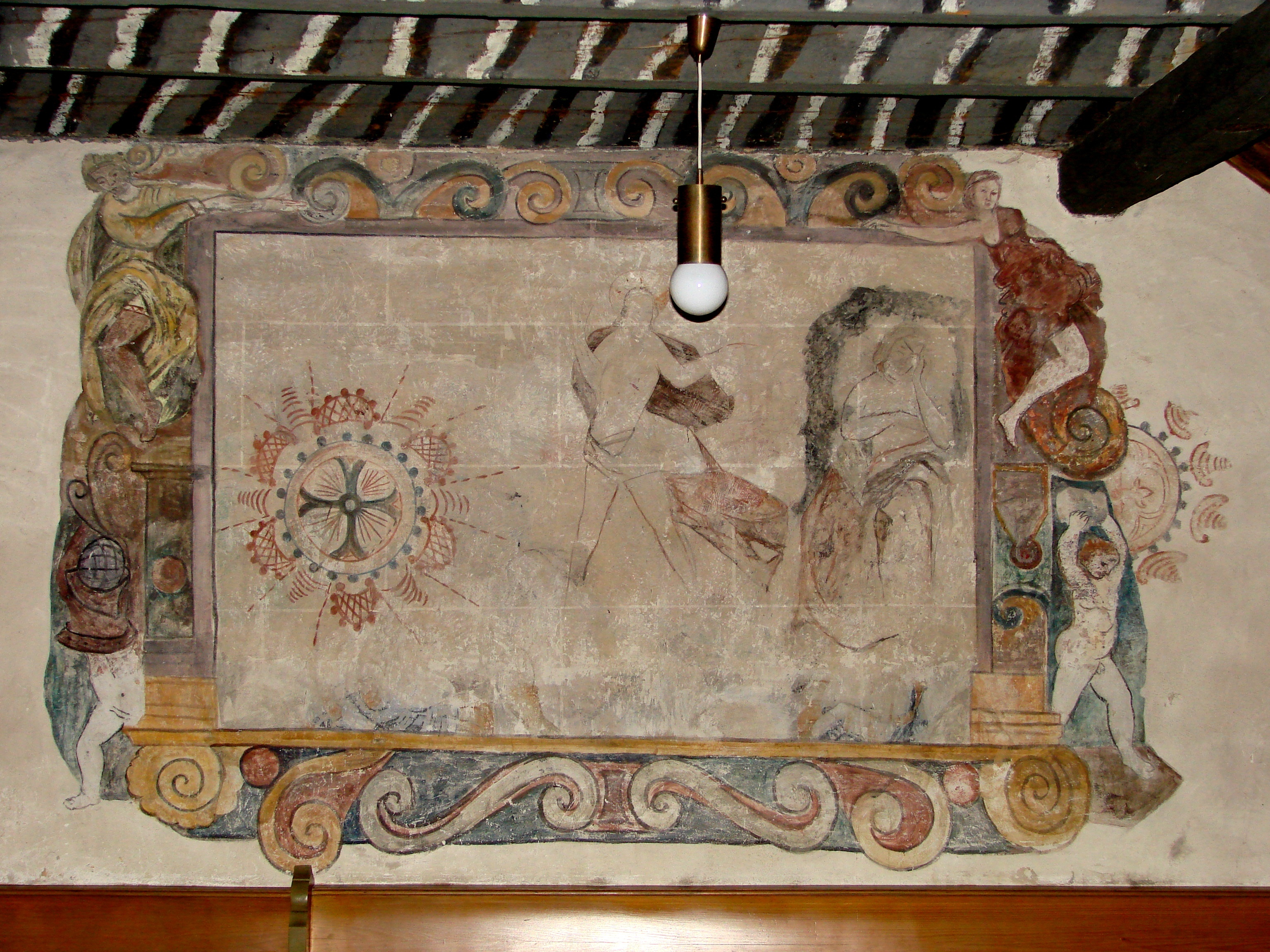
Medieval fresco on the west wall

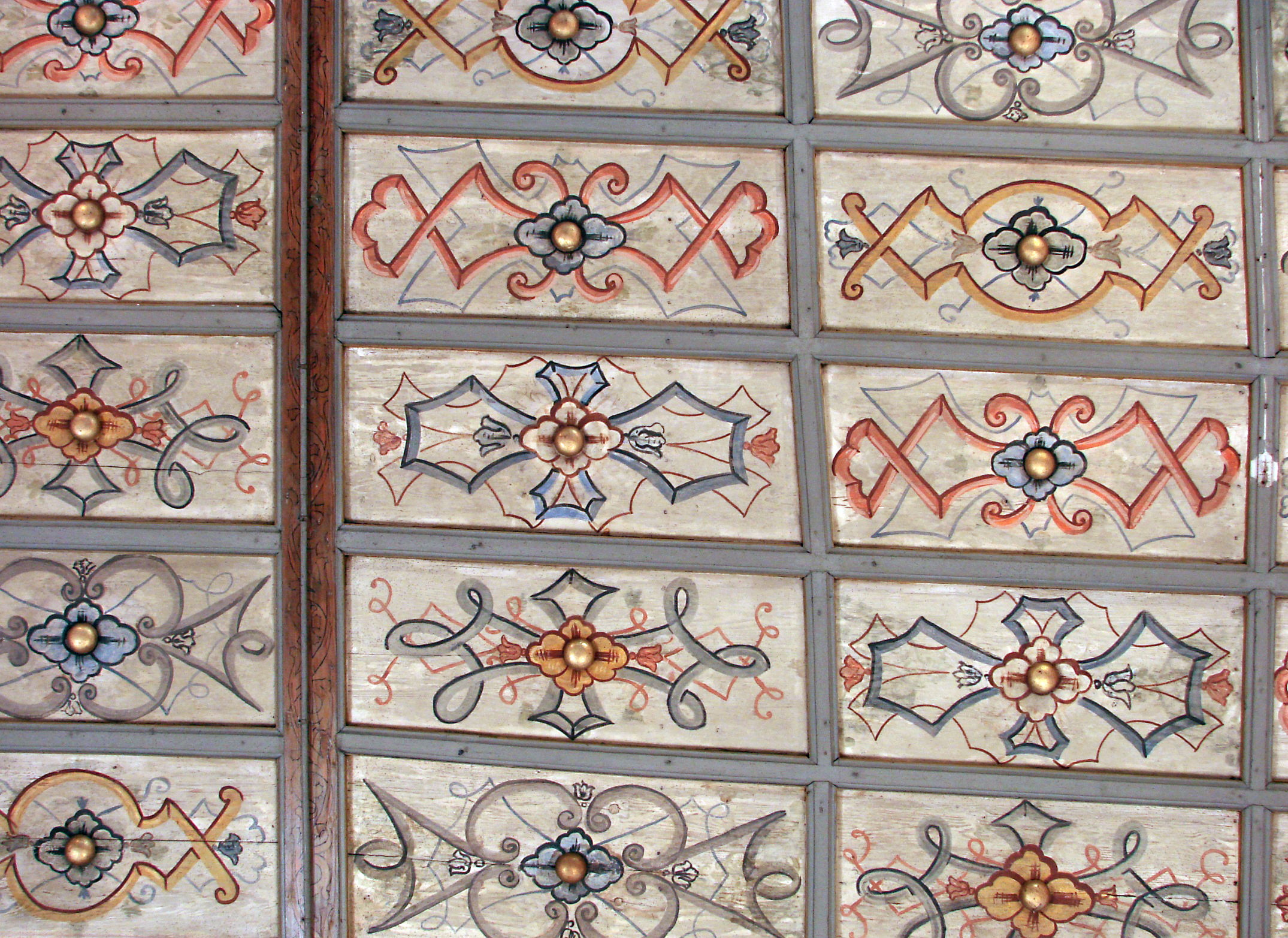
Panelled ceiling over the nave

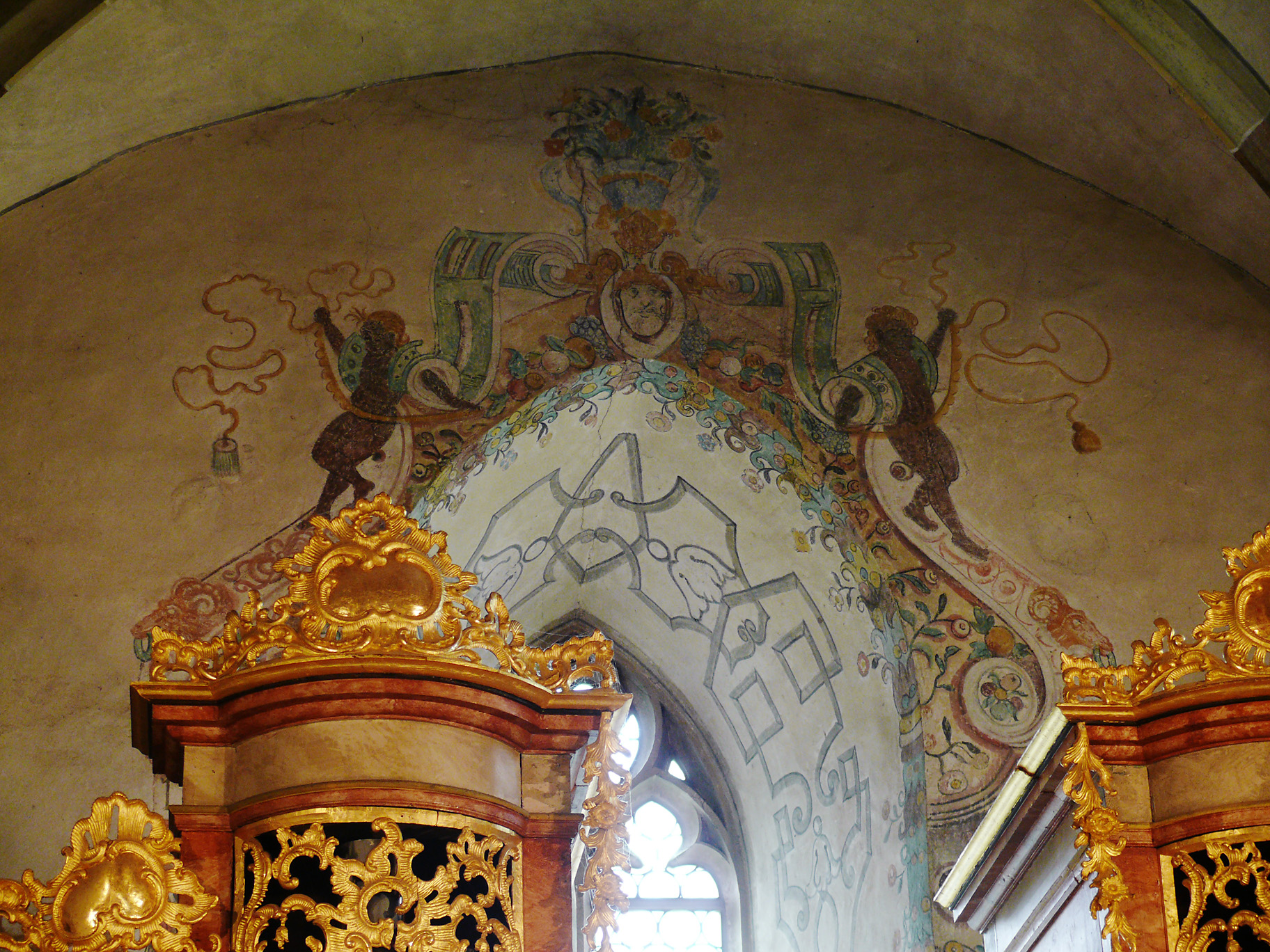
Renaissance painting and ornamental imagery (Bandelwerk) on the eastern window of the chancel

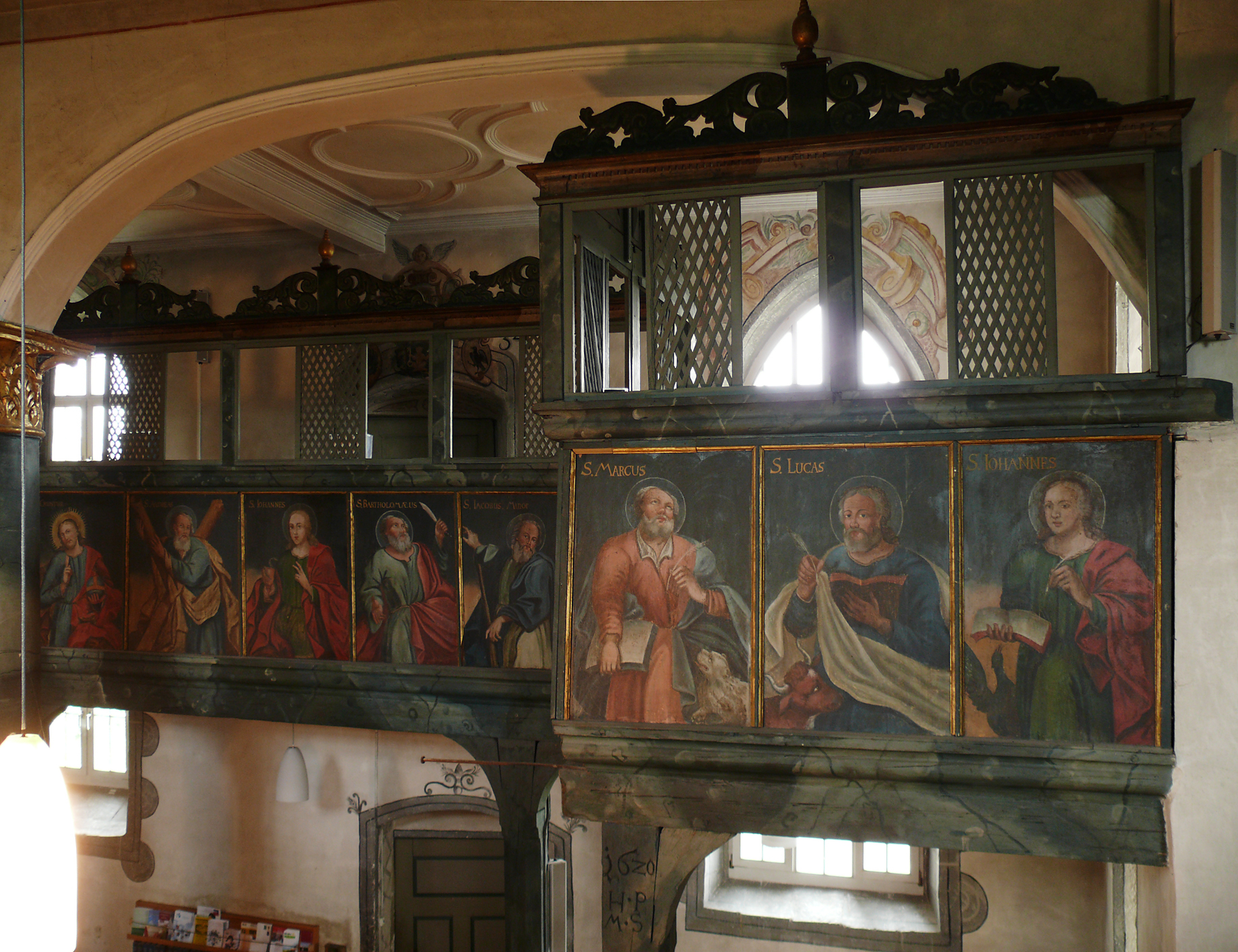
View of the southern gallery with pictures of the Apostles and Evangelists

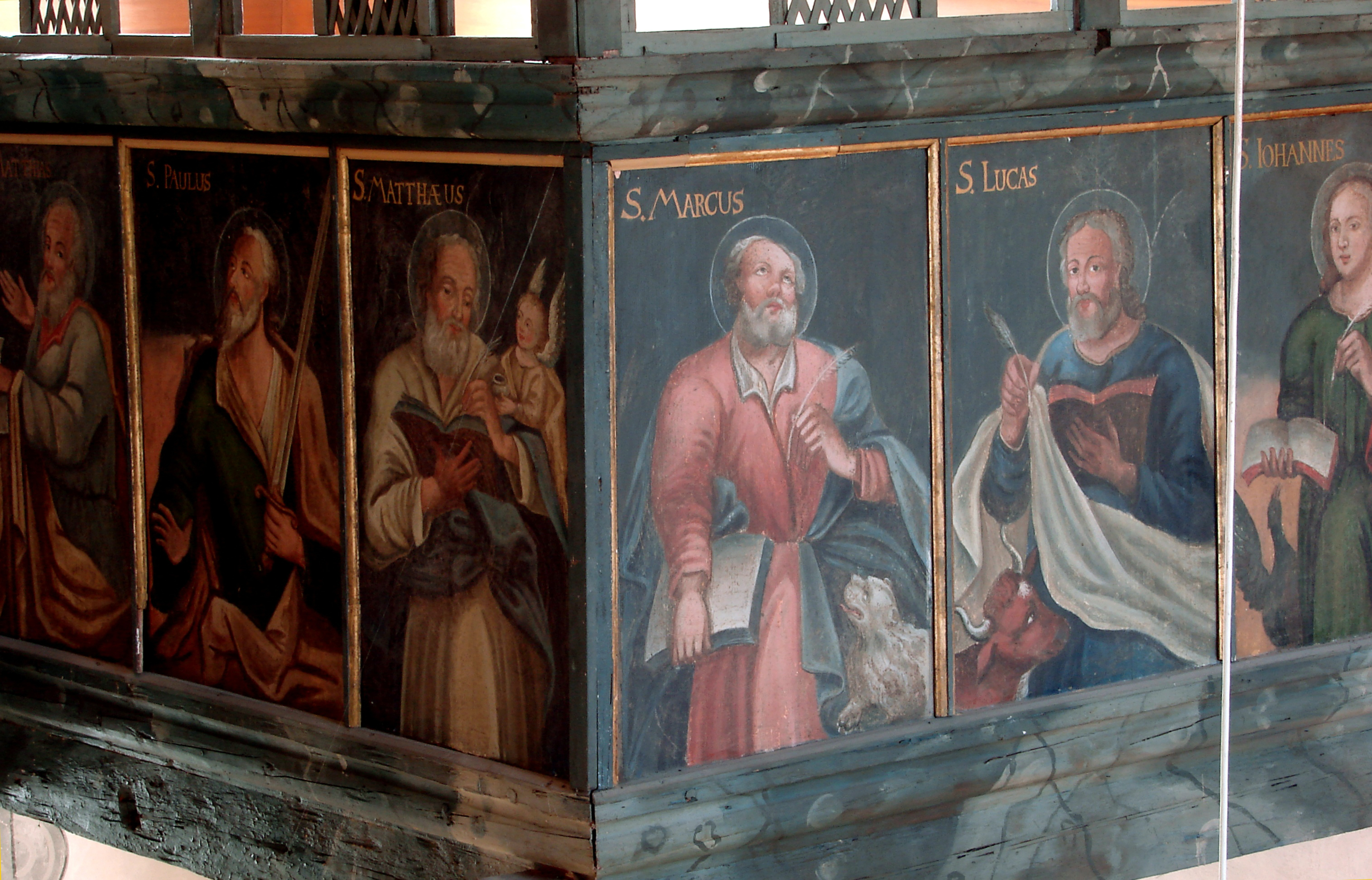
Detail of the south gallery: the Evangelists

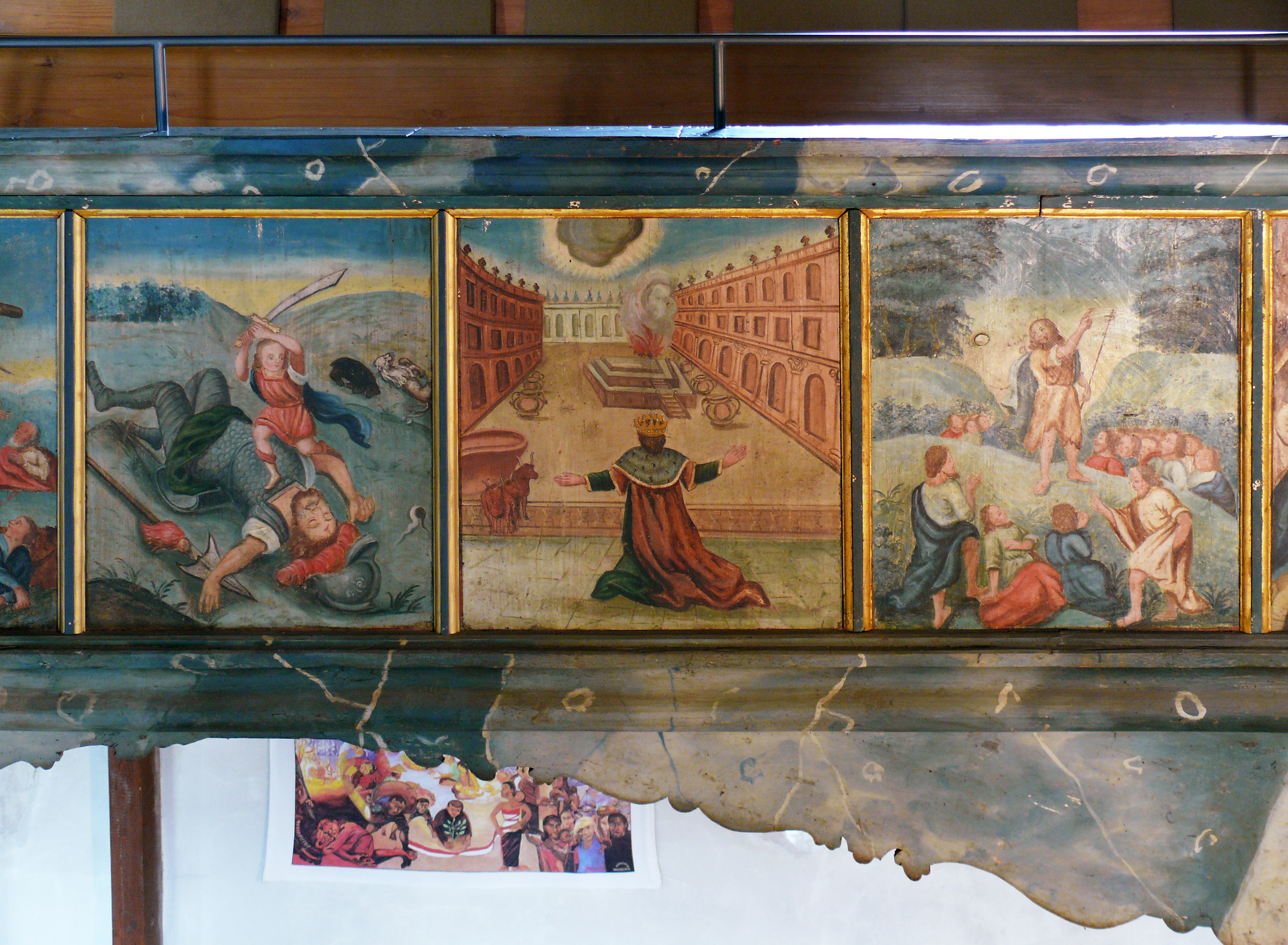
Detail of the north gallery: David killing Goliath, King Solomon

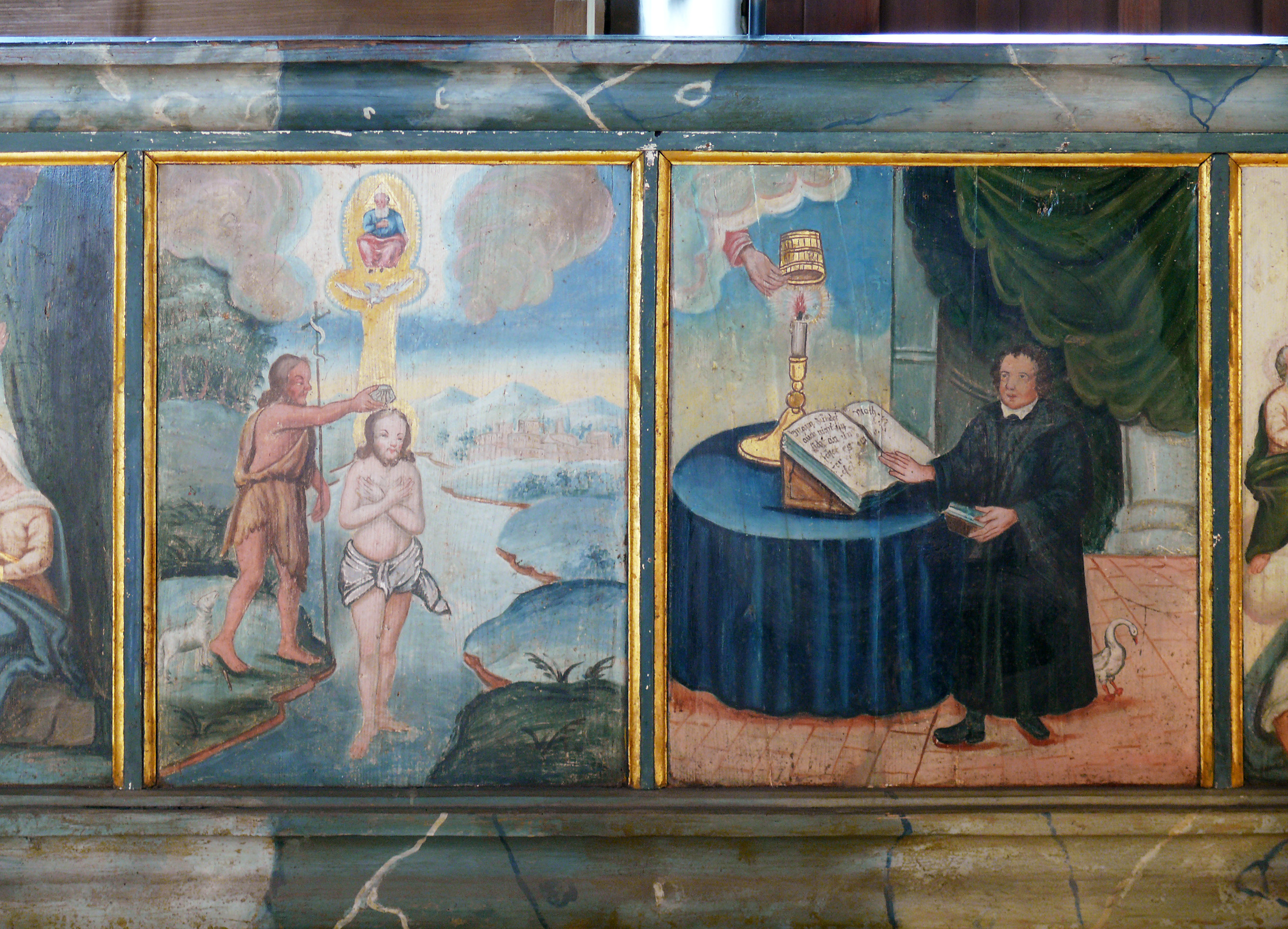
Detail of the north gallery: Baptism of Jesus; Martin Luther with a goose as a symbol for Jan Hus (Czech: husa meaning goose)

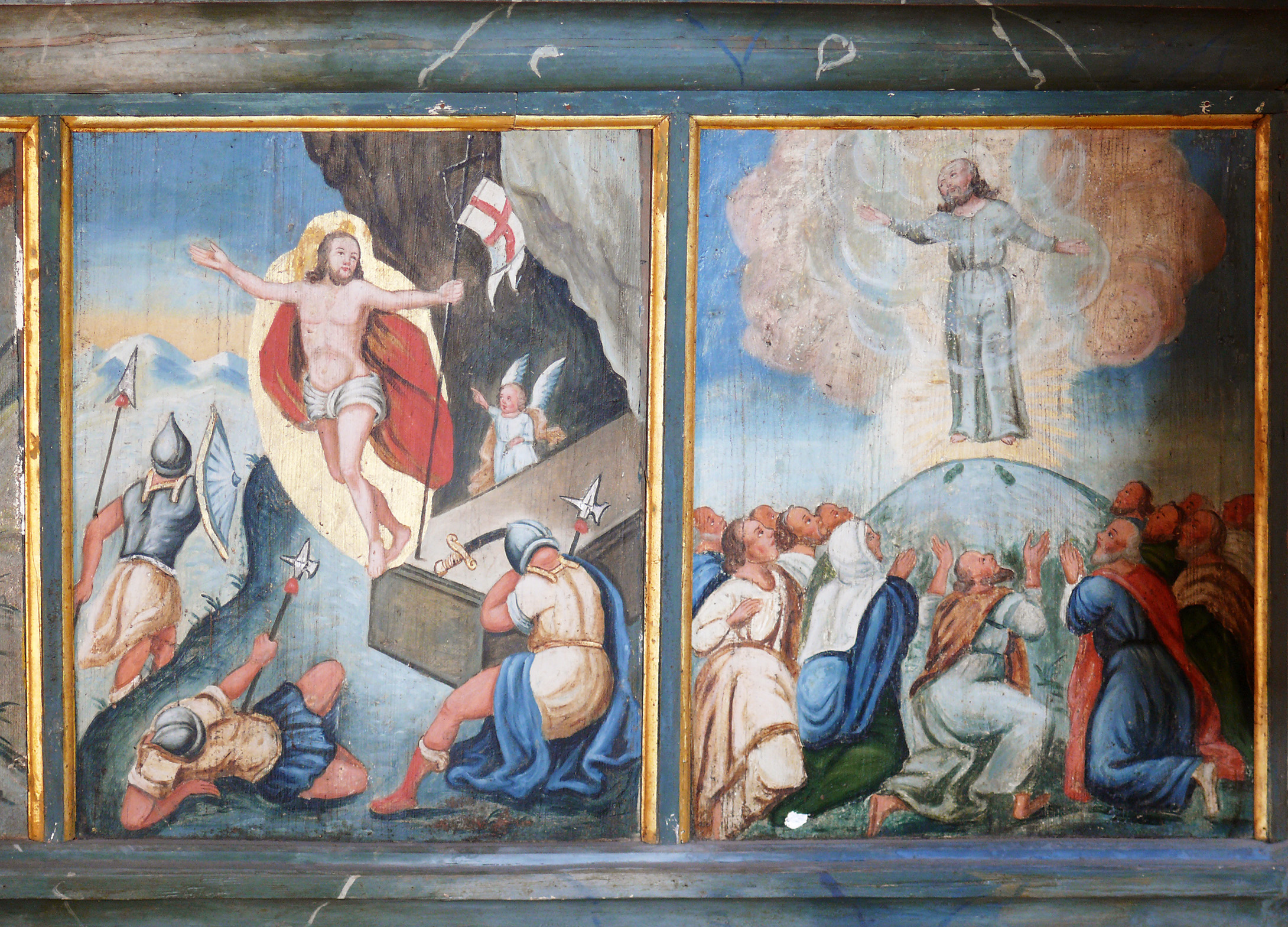
Detail of the north gallery: Resurrection of Jesus and Ascension (note the relinquished shoes)

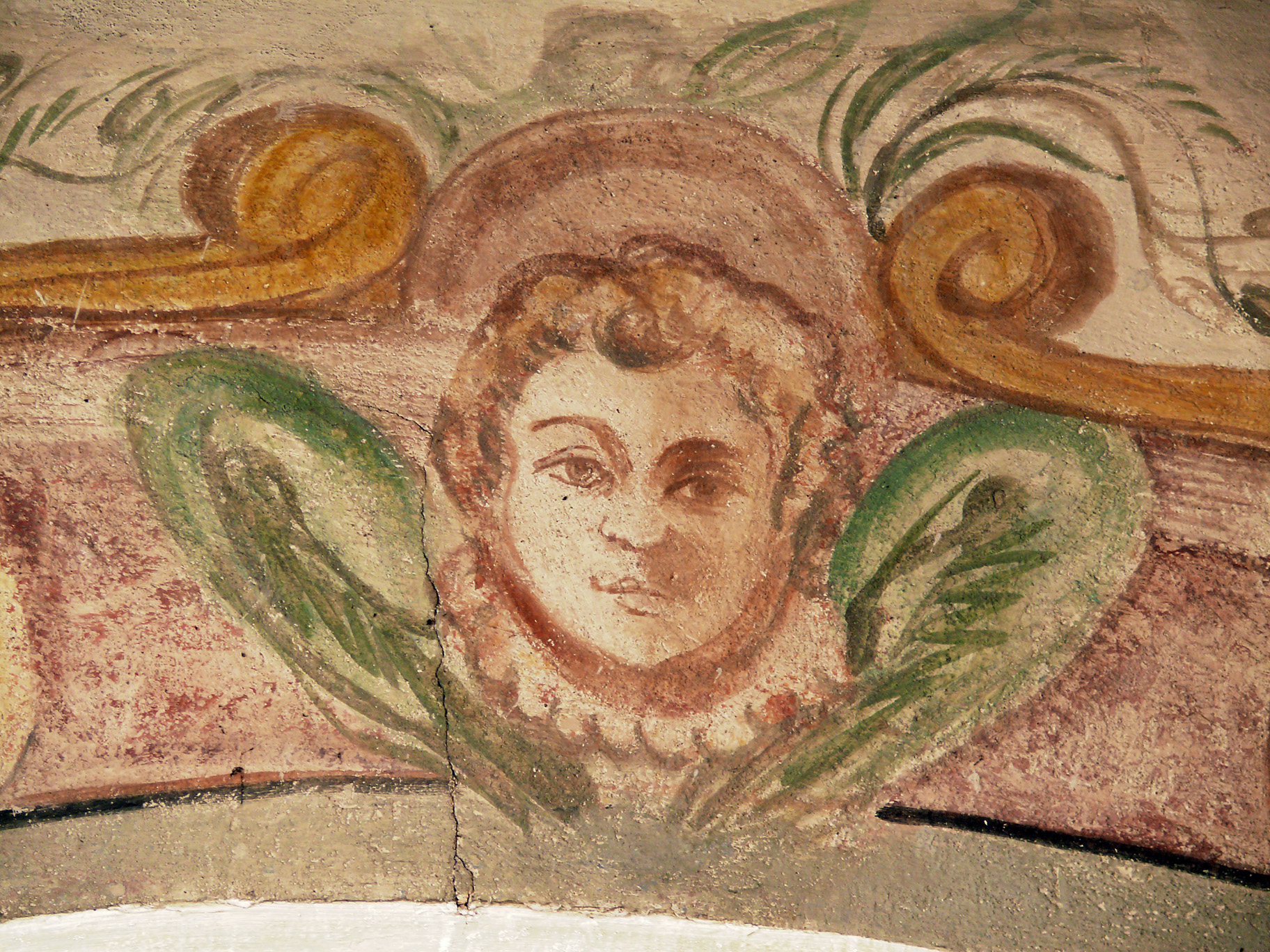
Putto, mural on the passage to the stairwell

== Organ ==
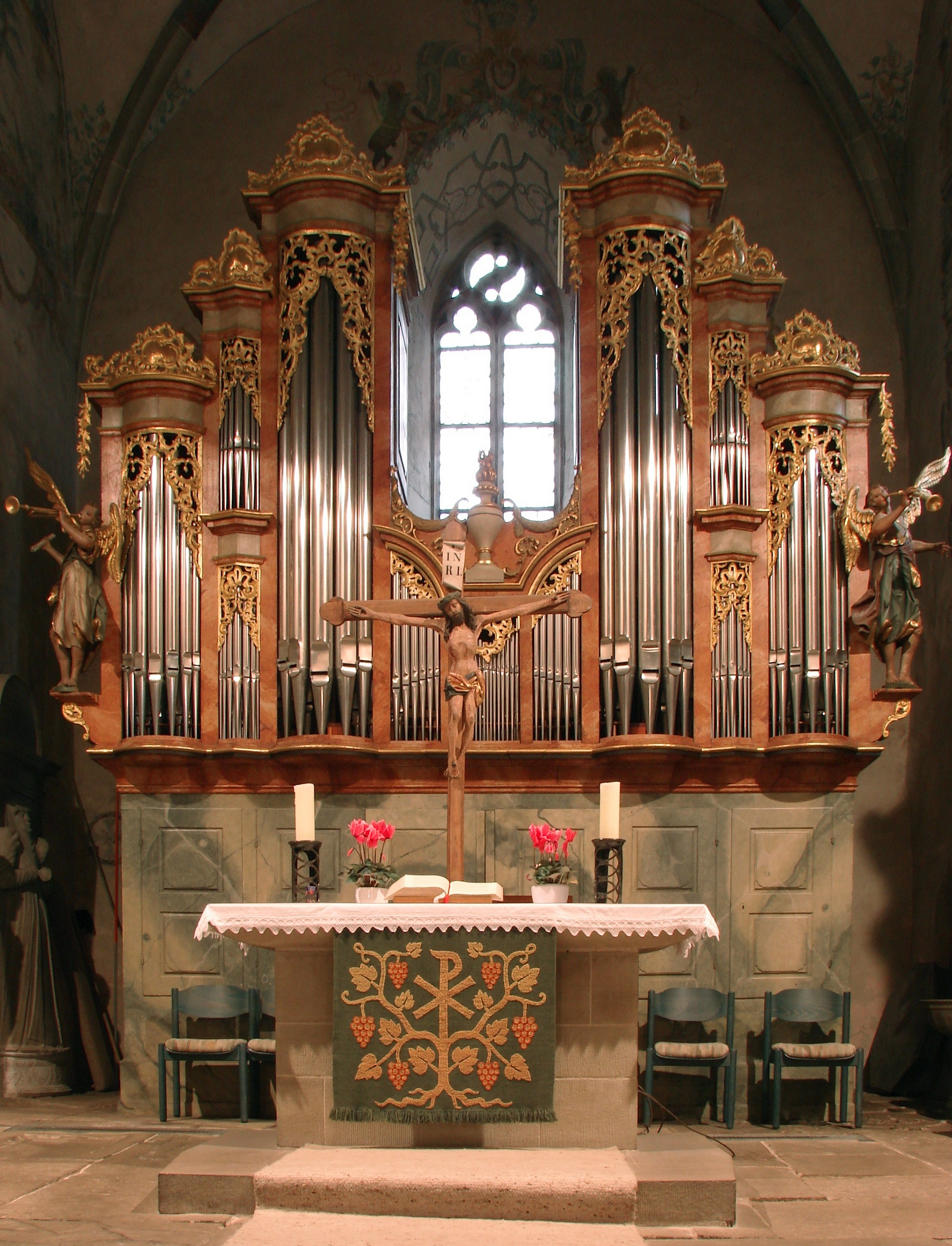
The organ

The organ solemnly inaugurated in 1766 was made by the renowned master organ builder Johannes Weinmar from Bondorf. It is richly decorated with figures of trumpeting angels and gilded arabesques. Originally it stood in its own gallery which, however, was removed during renovation work in 1898. On this occasion the pipes too were replaced by new ones more in accordance with the style of the times. In the second renovation in 1981, new pipes were again installed, this time with a view to reproducing as closely as possible the sound of the Baroque original.

The organ has a total of 21 stops, distributed on principal, positive, and pedal.

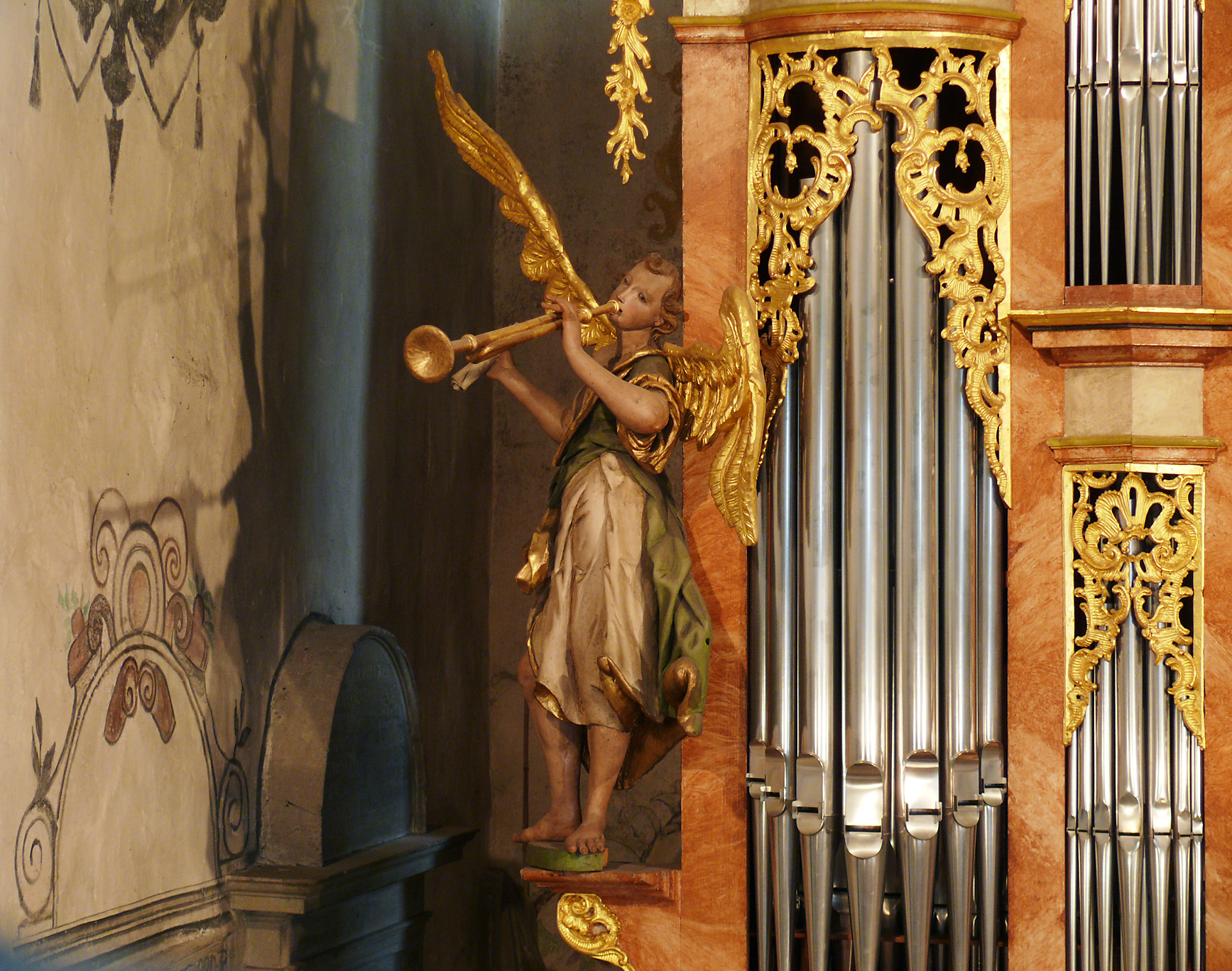
Trumpeting angel to the left

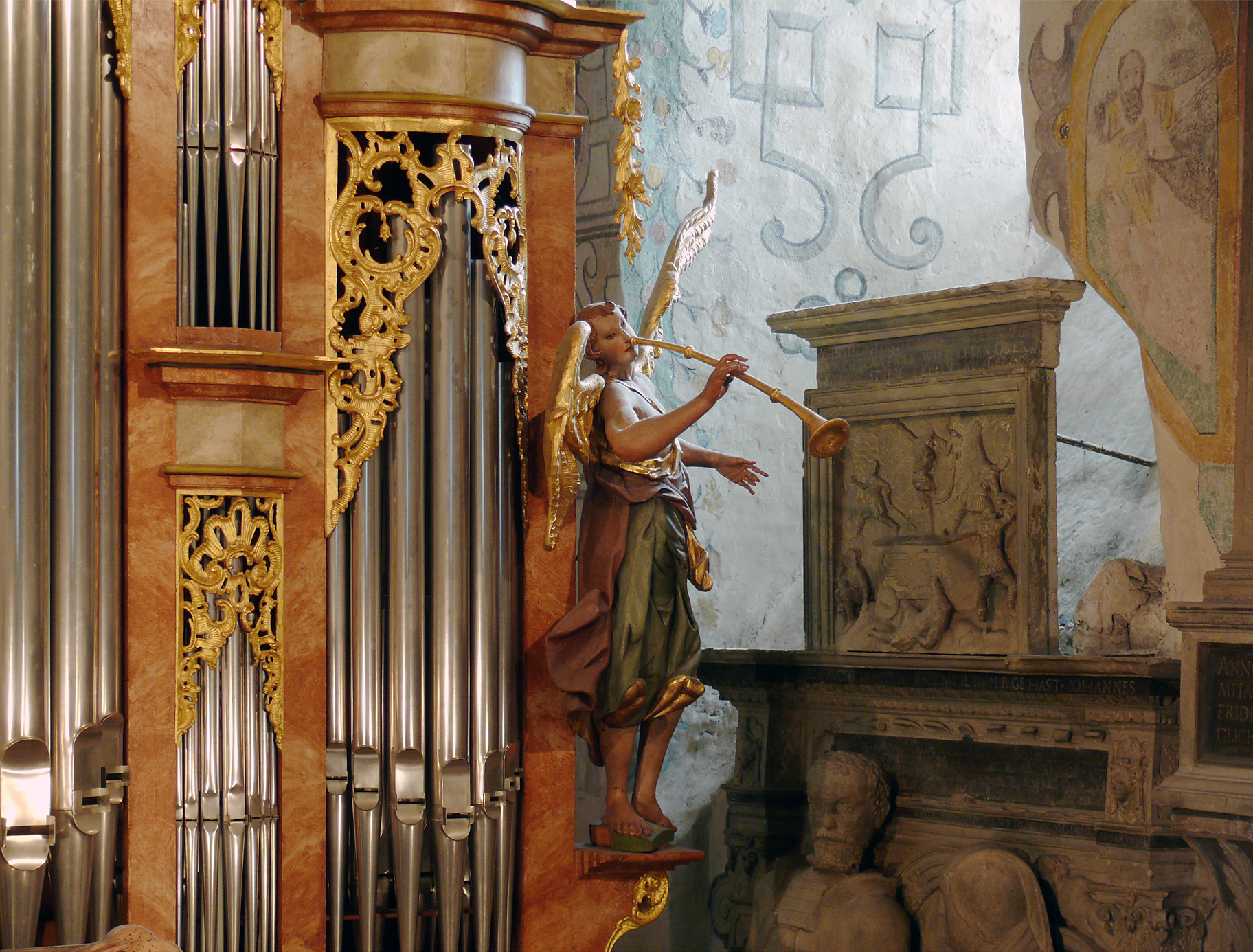
Angel on the right

== Tombs and Epitaphs ==
Amandus church was not only a parish church, but also served the local nobility for representation and burials. Thus the tombstones of Bernhard (died 1467) and Werner (died 1492) Nothaft, both Nothaft knights, are to be found on the southern part of the east wall. Next to these is the colourful and richly ornamented Rococo tombstone of Ludwig von Gemmingen († 1771).

In the chancel there are numerous tombs and epitaphs remarkable either for their sculptural design or their colouring. They preserve the memory of the noble families of Hallweil, Freyberg, Stammheim, Sachsenheim and Breitenbach from the Renaissance period. The walled up burial vault of these families is situated beneath the chancel.

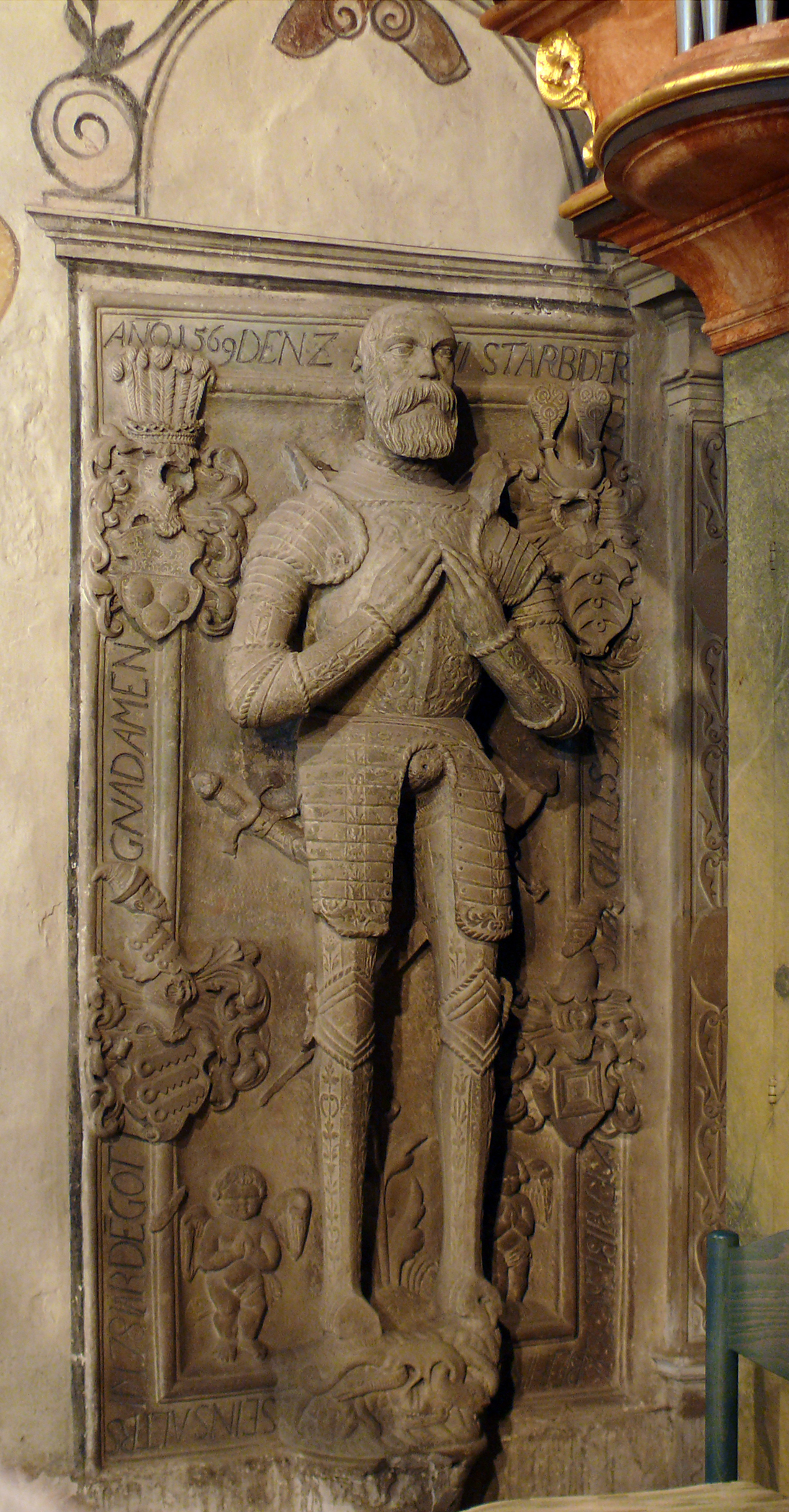
Tombstone Ludwig von Freyberg (died 1569)

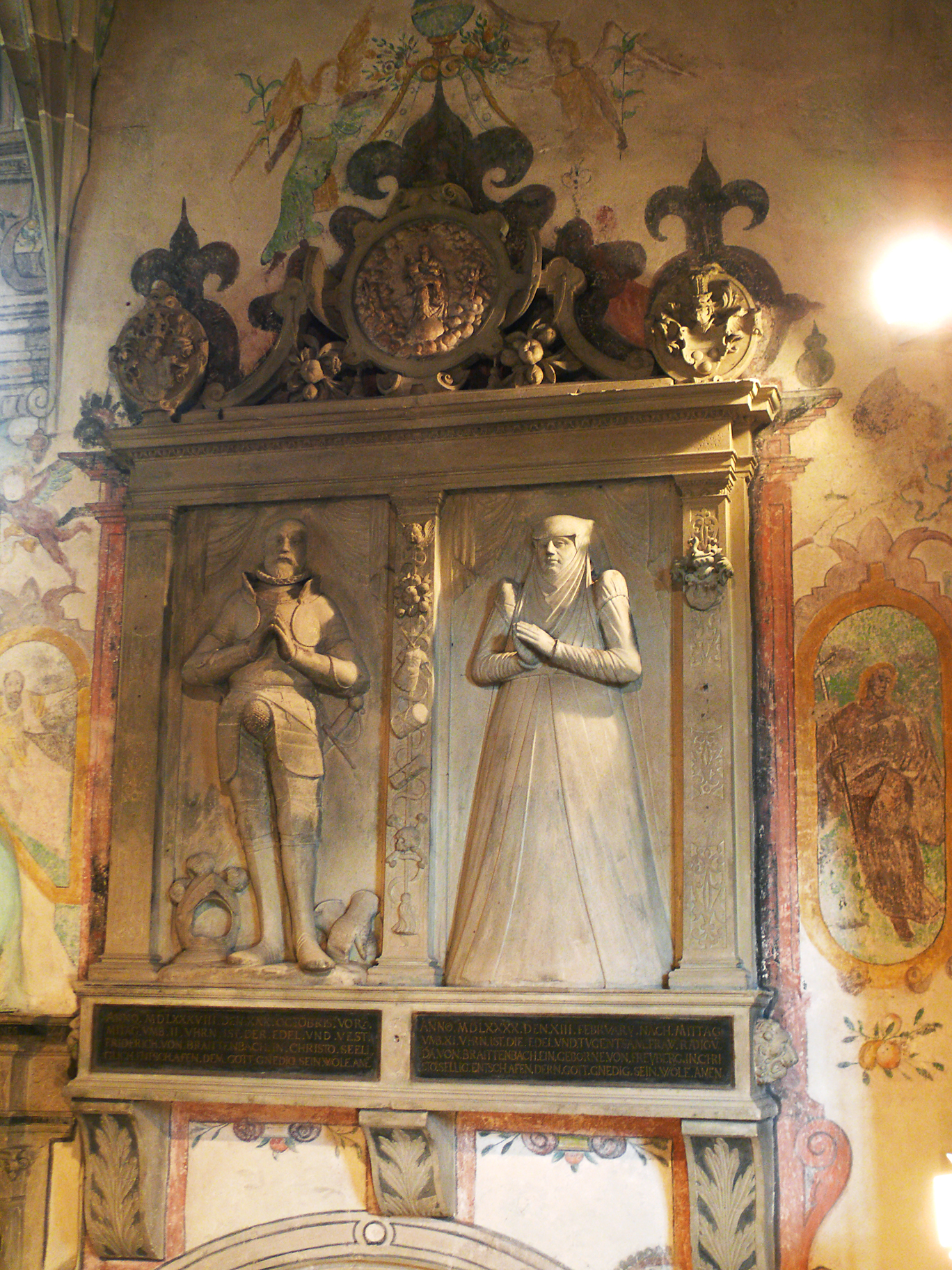
Tombstone of Friedrich von Breitenbach (died 1588) and his wife Radigunda born von Freyberg

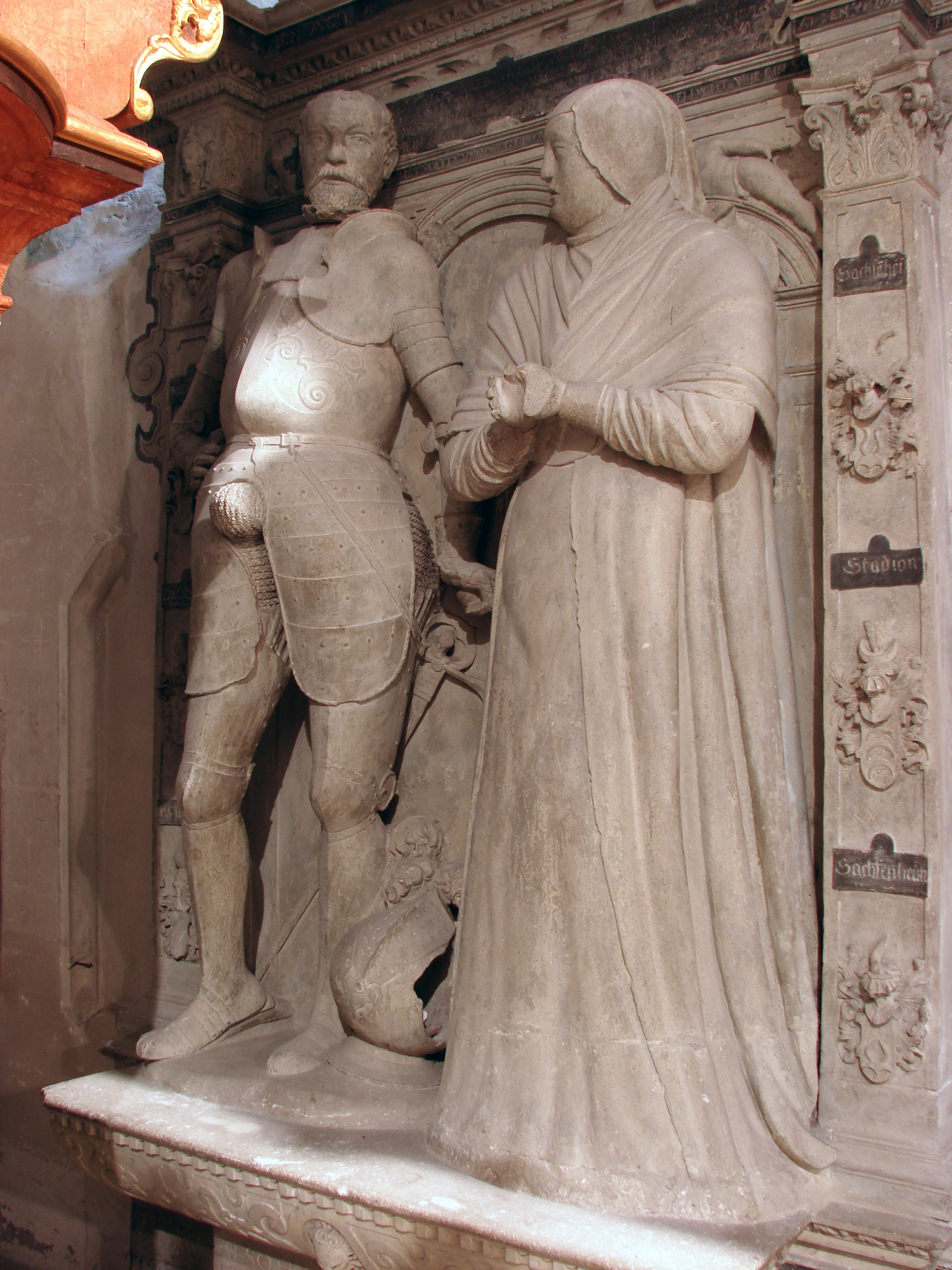
Tombstone of Hans Georg von Hallweil (died 1593) and his wife Maria Magdalena born von Freyberg

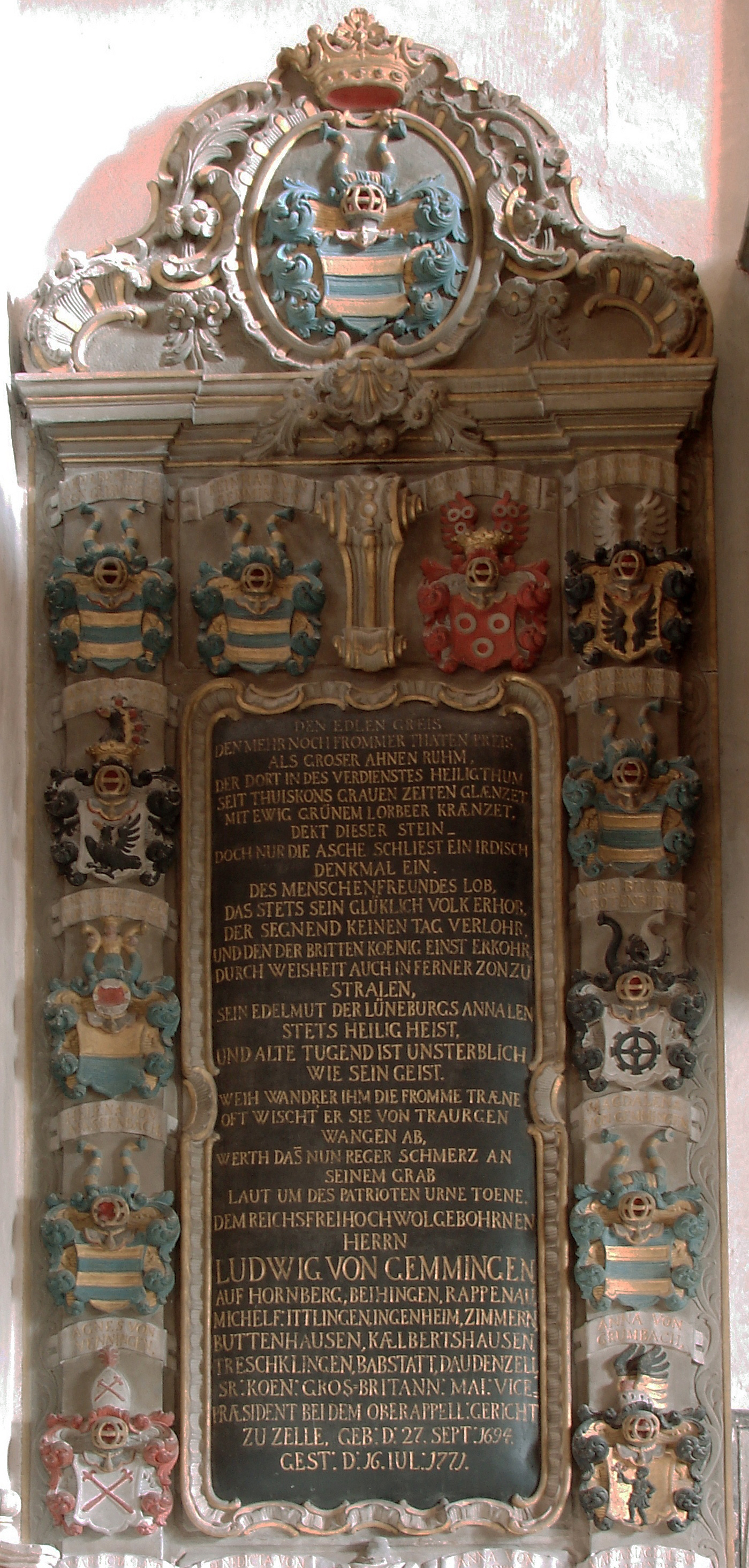
Tombstone of Ludwig von Gemmingen (died 1771)

== Literature ==
- Amanduskirche Freiberg am Neckar, Kirchenführer (in German), Erhältlich bei der Kirchengemeinde
- Friedrich Winter (2001), Amanduskirche Beihingen. Die Chronik einer Kirche zwischen Herrschaft und Bürgerschaft (in German), Freiberg am Neckar: Memminger, ISBN 3-9807733-0-2
