= Donald Kachamba =

Malawian musician

- Born: 18 September 1953; Blantyre, Malawi
- Died: 12 February 2001 (aged 47)
- Occupations: Musician, composer, bandleader

Donald Kachamba (18 September 1953 – 12 February 2001) was a Chewa guitarist, composer and bandleader from Malawi.

== Biography ==
Kachamba was born on 18 October 1953 in Blantyre, and died 12 January 2001, in Chileka.

Together with his older brother Daniel (1947–1987), he recorded an album in 1972 under the name The Kachamba Brothers Band. Beginning that year, Kachamba toured 33 countries in Africa, Europe and the Americas. In May 1988, he toured Finland on the invitation of the Institute for Workers Music, Helsinki. In May 1989, he performed at the Ethnographic Museum of the University of Zürich. In 1991, his band toured Belgium and Germany. In September 1994, Donald Kachamba was invited to the colloquium "Music and Anthropology" in Lisbon to present one of his films. Thereafter he gave lecture performances in Berlin, Frankfurt and Salzburg. The most recent European tour was in January 1995 to the Netherlands, Belgium and France (on the invitation by Radio France).

Kachamba was artist-in-residence at UCLA's Department of Ethnomusicology from 1999 until July 2000.

Donald Kachamba died on Friday, 12 January 2001.

== Works ==
=== Audio recordings ===
- Concert Kwela – Donald Kachamba et son ensemble LDX 274972 CM 212, Le Chant du Monde 1994.
- Donald Kachamba; Donald Kachamba's Band (1978). Simanje-Manje and Kwela from Malaŵi. AIT Records.
- The Kachamba Brothers' Band (1972)
- Donald Kachamba's Band: Simanje-Manje and Kwela from Malawi (1979)
- Donald Kachamba et son ensemble Concert Kwela, Le Chant du Monde (1991)
- Donald Kachamba's Kwela Band: Live and in Kachamba Donald's Studio 1974–1995, popular African music (1999).

=== Movies ===
- Donald Kachamba's Kwela Music. Malawi Twist Encyclopaedia Cinematographica Göttingen, B 2328 (Institute for Scientific Film) 1978
- Donald Kachamba's Kwela Music: Simanje-manje, cha-cha-cha Encyclopaedia Cinematographica, Göttingen 2329 E 1978.

== Notes and references ==
- Harris, Craig. "Donald Kachamba Biography". AllMusic.
- Kubik, Gerhard (July 1979). "Donald Kachamba's Kwela Music". The Society of Malawi Journal. 32 (2): 45–59. JSTOR 29778423.
- Kubik, Gerhard (2005). "A Presentation of Kwela Music". Scientific African.
- Kubik, Gerhard (2008). Africa and the Blues. Univ. Press of Mississippi. ISBN 978-1-60473-728-8.
- Kubik, Gerhard (2010). Theory of African Music. University of Chicago Press. ISBN 978-0-226-45694-2.
- wa Mukuna, Kazadi (1980). Readings in African Urban Music. African Studies Center, Michigan State University.
