= List of museums in Baden-Württemberg =

This is a list of museums in the state of Baden-Württemberg, Germany. Also included are non-profit art galleries and university art galleries.

Name	Location	Area of Focus	Summary
Afrika-Haus Freiberg	Freiberg am Neckar	Art	African art
Archaeological State Museum of Baden-Württemberg	Konstanz	Archaeology	Archaeological finds, pile houses, waterborne transportation, Roman settlements, life in the Middle Ages
Atomkeller Museum	Haigerloch	Science, History	Opened in 1980 in a former beer cellar beneath the castle church, the museum documents the nuclear research tests conducted there in 1944-1945 by German physicists before the site was dismantled by the Alsos Mission
Augustiner Museum	Freiburg im Breisgau	Art	Includes works from the Middle Ages up to the Baroque period, as well as paintings from the 19th century
Automuseum Dr. Carl Benz	Ladenburg	Automotive	
Baden State Museum	Karlsruhe	Multiple	website, cultural, art and regional history of the state of Baden-Württemberg
Bebenhausen Monastery and Palace	Tübingen	Historic house	Medieval monastery with church, 19th-century palace
Black Forest Costume Museum	Haslach im Kinzigtal	Fashion	Traditional clothing and costume of the Black Forest region
Black Forest Open Air Museum	Gutach	Open-air	Includes six fully furnished farmhouses
Braith-Mali-Museum	Biberach an der Riss	Local	Local history, archaeology, art and natural history
Brenz Castle	Sontheim	Local	Features a community museum of area geology, paleontology and local history
Bruchsal Palace	Bruchsal	Historic house	website, tours of the reconstructed Baroque palace interiors, houses the German Museum of Mechanical Musical Instruments and the Bruchsal Town Museum
Center for Art and Media Karlsruhe	Karlsruhe	Art	Features the Media Museum for new media art and the Museum of Contemporary Art
Colombischlössle Archeological Museum	Freiburg im Breisgau	Archaeology	Human development of the High and upper Rhine from the Paleolithic Age to the Early Middle Ages
DBK Historic Railway	Crailsheim	Railway	Heritage railway
Deutsches Zweirad- und NSU-Museum	Neckarsulm	Transport	Motorcycles and bicycles
Documentation and Cultural Centre of German Sinti and Roma	Heidelberg	History	History of the genocide perpetrated upon the Sinti and Roma by the Nazis
Dominican Museum of Rottweil	Rottweil	Archaeology, Art	includes a section about the oldest Roman settlement in Baden-Württemberg, Arae Flaviae
Dorf- und Uhrenmuseum Gütenbach	Gütenbach	Horology	Local history of clockmaking, focusing on the history of making wooden clock movements
Dornier Museum Friedrichshafen	Friedrichshafen	Aerospace	Aircraft designs of Claude Dornier, the Dornier company and aerospace products of Airbus
Erinnerungsstätte für die Freiheitsbewegungen in der deutschen Geschichte	Rastatt	History	Museum and memorial to free democratic traditions in Germany, located in Schloss Rastatt
Fabergé Museum	Baden-Baden	Decorative arts	Items made by the Russian jewellery firm Fabergé
Federseemuseum	Bad Buchau	Archaeology	with an information center for the Prehistoric pile dwellings around the Alps, a World Heritage Site
German Clock Museum	Furtwangen im Schwarzwald	Horology	History of timekeeping, collection of clocks and watches from the Black Forest area and around the world
German Museum of Mechanical Musical Instruments	Bruchsal	Music	website, branch museum of the Badisches Landesmuseum Karlsruhe, features 18th and 19th-century self-playing musical instruments in clocks, cabinets, music boxes, orchestrion, organs and mechanical figures
German Phono Museum	Sankt Georgen im Schwarzwald	Music	History of the music communications industry from phonographs up to the CD
Glockenmuseum Stiftskirche Herrenberg	Herrenberg	Music	Church tower with over 30 bells from 12 centuries and many different regions, the church's own bells
Gochsheim Castle	Kraichtal	Local	Exhibits on local history, many work of local artist Karl Hubbuch, and world's largest collection of irons
Grafeneck Euthanasia Centre	Grafeneck	History	Memorial site dedicated to the victims of the state-authorised euthanasia programme referred to as Action T4
Haus der Geschichte Baden-Württemberg	Karlsruhe	History	website, history of southwest Germany from 1790 to the present
Hegel House	Stuttgart	Biographical	Life and work of philosopher Georg Wilhelm Friedrich Hegel
Heidelberg Castle	Heidelberg	Historic house	Tours of the castle remains and a pharmacy museum
Hellenstein Castle	Heidenheim an der Brenz	Multiple	Partly ruined castle, includes the Museum of Coaches, Carriages and Carts, and the Hellenstein Castle Museum with local history, toys, religious artifacts and neolithic tools
Hirsau Cloister Museum	Hirsau	Religious	website; museum of the Badisches Landesmuseum Karlsruhe, history and artifacts of the former Hirsau Abbey
Hohenzollern Castle	Bisingen	Historic house	19th-century castle on a bluff, ancestral seat of the Hohenzollern dynasty which produced Prussian Kings and German Emperors
IG 3-Seenbahn	Seebrugg	Railway	Heritage railway with locomotives and wagons typical of the area between 1945 and 1960
Jewish Museum, Emmendingen	Emmendingen	Jewish	Culture and history of the Jewish community in Emmendingen between 1716 and 1940
John Rabe Communication Centre	Heidelberg	Biographical	Life of businessman John Rabe who tried to stop the atrocities of the Japanese army during the Nanking Massacre and worked to protect Chinese civilians
Jünger-Haus Wilflingen	Langenenslingen	Biographical	Last home of German writer Ernst Jünger
Karlsruhe Palace	Karlsruhe	Multiple	Houses the Badisches Landesmuseum Karlsruhe
Katzenstein Castle	Dischingen	Historic house	17th-century castle
Kepler Museum	Weil der Stadt	Biographical	website, birthplace home of astronomer and mathematician Johannes Kepler
Kunsthalle Mannheim	Mannheim	Art	Modern and contemporary art
Kunsthalle Tübingen	Tübingen	Art	Modern and contemporary art
Kunstmuseum Stuttgart	Stuttgart	Art	Modern and contemporary art
Kurpfälzisches Museum	Heidelberg	Multiple	Art, decorative arts, archaeology and costumes
Landesmuseum Württemberg	Stuttgart	Multiple	Old Castle houses archaeological artifacts, Württemberg crown jewels, medieval art, antique and modern glass, clocks and scientific instruments, a museum for children, musical instruments
Langenstein Castle	Orsingen-Nenzingen	Amusement	Features the Carnival Museum (Fasnachtmuseum) with masks, costumes, terracotta figures
Lichtenstein Castle	Lichtenstein	Historic house	Gothic Revival 19th-century castle, features collection of historic weapons and armour
Limesmuseum Aalen	Aalen	Archaeology	located at the place of the largest Roman cavalry fort north of the Alps until about 200 CE; opened in 1964
Linden Museum	Stuttgart	Ethnography	Exhibits from cultures around the world including South and Southeast Asia, Africa, the Islamic world form the Near East to Pakistan, China and Japan, and artifacts from North and Latin America and Oceania
Ludwigsburg Palace	Ludwigsburg	Multiple	Baroque palace to tour, features 3 museums: Baroque Gallery presents the State Gallery's collection of Baroque paintings; Porcelain Museum; Baroque Fashion Museum presents clothes from 1750 to 1820
Mannheim Palace	Mannheim	Historic house	The main floor rooms of the 18th-century Baroque palace have been restored and furnished with period items including tapestries, ornate furniture, paintings, porcelain and silverware.
Maulbronn Monastery	Maulbronn	Religious	Medieval Cistercian monastery complex
Meersburg Castle	Meersburg	Historic house	Medieval castle, features over 30 furnished rooms and an armoury
Melanchthonhaus	Bretten	Religious	History of the Protestant Reformation and life of Philipp Melanchthon
Mercedes-Benz Museum	Stuttgart	Automotive	Mercedes-Benz cars and other vehicles, history of the company
Meßkirch Castle	Meßkirch	Multiple	Castle tours and cultural center with a county art gallery, a museum about philosopher Martin Heidegger, and the Oldtimer Museum with old automobiles and motorcycles,
Museum Art.Plus	Donaueschingen	Art	Contemporary art
Museum at Market Square	Karlsruhe	Decorative arts	website, decorative and applied art objects and furniture including Art Nouveau, Art Deco, 20th-century fashion, modern and contemporary furniture; museum of the Badisches Landesmuseum Karlsruhe
Museum at the Market	Schiltach	Local	website, local history
Museum Autovision	Altlußheim	Automotive	Includes cars, motorcycles, bicycles (most of which were built by NSU Motorenwerke AG) and alternative propulsion
Museum der Alltagskultur	Waldenbuch	Culture	Everyday cultural objects including furniture, household items, personal items, beliefs, folk and pop culture
Museum in the Majolica	Karlsruhe	Ceramics	website, history and artifacts of the Majolica Porcelain Manufactory; museum of the Badisches Landesmuseum Karlsruhe
Museum of Clockmaking	Villingen-Schwenningen	Horology	History of the clockmaking industry in the town
Museum of Modern Literature	Marbach am Neckar	Literature	Focus is 20th-century literature
Museum of Upper Rhine Literature	Karlsruhe	Literature	website, includes handwriting, first editions, letters, photography and audio artefacts
Neue Staatsgalerie	Stuttgart	Art	20th-century modern art
Neues Schloss	Meersburg	Historic house	18th-century Baroque palace, features a collection of shells, snails, minerals and fossils
Pharmacy Museum	Schiltach	Medical	website, 19th-century pharmacy used until the 1980s
Porsche Museum, Stuttgart	Stuttgart	Automotive	Porsche vehicles and history of the company
President Friedrich Ebert Memorial	Heidelberg	Biographical	Life and of Friedrich Ebert
Railway Vehicle Preservation Company	Stuttgart	Railway	
Reiss Engelhorn Museum	Mannheim	Multiple	Exhibitions in four museum locations, includes art and cultural history, theater and literature, antiquities, international photography, life of poet and playwright Friedrich Schiller, archaeology, Ancient Egypt, Greece and Rome, non-European cultures, and natural history
Römerhaus	Walheim	Archaeology	Remains of a Roman settlement
Römerkeller	Oberriexingen	Archaeology	excavated site of a Roman settlement
Römermuseum	Osterburken	Archaeology	an archaeological excavation site around a former Roman military settlement; since 2005 part of the World Heritage Site Upper Germanic-Rhaetian Limes
Salem Monastery and Palace	Salem	Historic house	Baroque-period imperial abbey and church
Schloss Favorite (Rastatt)	Rastatt	Historic house	18th-century Baroque summer residence and hunting palace, features Asian and European porcelain, glass and faience collection
Schloss Kirchheim	Kirchheim unter Teck	Historic house	Renaissance fortress palace with 19th-century furnishings
Schloss Rastatt	Rastatt	Historic house	18th-century Baroque palace, tours include admission to the Military Museum
Schüttesäge Museum	Schiltach	Local	Themes of forestry, tanning and timber rafting in the area
Schwarzwaldmuseum Triberg	Triberg im Schwarzwald	Local	website, local history, culture, clockmaking, clothing, mechanical orchestras and typical crafts
Schwetzingen Palace	Schwetzingen	Historic house	18th-century palace and gardens
Sigmaringen Castle	Sigmaringen	Historic house	Includes collections of pre- and ancient historical objects, works from Swabian artists, carvers and metalworkers, Hall of Weapons with one of the largest private weapon collections in Europe, and the Marstallmuseum with the princely fleet of carriages
Sinsheim Auto & Technik Museum	Sinsheim	Transport	Includes aircraft, automobiles, motorcycles, locomotives, tractors, steam engines and trucks, tanks and military equipment
South German Railway Museum	Heilbronn	Railway	Includes steam, diesel and electric locomotives, a locomotive roundhouse with a working turntable, and large wagon shed
Staatsgalerie Stuttgart	Stuttgart	Art	Includes Old German paintings 1300-1550, Italian paintings 1300-1800, Dutch paintings 1500-1700, German paintings of the baroque period, art from 1800 to 1900
Staatliche Kunsthalle Karlsruhe	Karlsruhe	Art	
Stadtmuseum Schramberg	Schramberg	Local	website, local history, castles, stoneware, straw braiding and watches
State Museum of Natural History Karlsruhe	Karlsruhe	Natural history	Includes animal dioramas, geology on the Upper Rhine, minerals, dinosaurs and fossils, climate, insects, African habitat dioramas, native flora and fauna
State Museum of Natural History Stuttgart	Stuttgart	Natural history	Two buildings: Museum am Löwentor with fossils excavated in south-west Germany, dinosaur models, insects in amber; Schloss Rosenstein about animals, habitats, ecosystems and evolution
Staufen Ceramics Museum	Staufen im Breisgau	Ceramics	website; museum of the Badisches Landesmuseum Karlsruhe
Technoseum	Mannheim	Technology	Technology and industry including technical, social and political changes since the 18th century
Tettnang Castle	Tettnang	Historic house	18th-century Baroque castle
Transylvanian Museum	Gundelsheim	Ethnic	Cultural heritage of the Transylvanian Saxons
Ulm Railway Society	Ulm	Railway	Four heritage railways
Urach Residential Palace	Bad Urach	Historic house	website, 15th-century Renaissance palace
Urgeschichtliches Museum Blaubeuren	Blaubeuren	Archaeology	with an information center for the Caves and Ice Age Art in the Swabian Jura, a World Heritage Site
Urmensch Museum	Steinheim an der Murr	Archaeology	website, physical and mental development of prehistoric man with an emphasis on the Steinheim skull
Urweltmuseum Aalen	Aalen	Archaeology	more than 1500 fossils from the Swabian Jura, including ammonites, ichthyosaurs and corals are on display
Viniculture Museum	Stuttgart	Wine	website, area wine-making industry
Vitra Design Museum	Weil am Rhein	Design	Modern furniture and design
Waldburg Castle	Waldburg	Historic house	Medieval castle
Water-Bath-Design Museum	Schiltach	Technology	website, history of Hansgrohe and its influence on bathroom technology and design
Wehrgeschichtliches Museum Rastatt	Rastatt	Military	Included with tours of Schloss Rastatt, relationship between state, society and the military, primarily in the southwest of Germany
Wiesloch Feldbahn and Industrial Museum	Wiesloch	Railway	Narrow-gauge railway and industrial heritage open-air museum
Zeppelin Museum Friedrichshafen	Friedrichshafen	Aerospace	History of the Zeppelin airships, combines technology and art
