= Crown of Baden =

Crown formerly used by the Grand Duke of Baden

Grand Ducal Crown of Baden
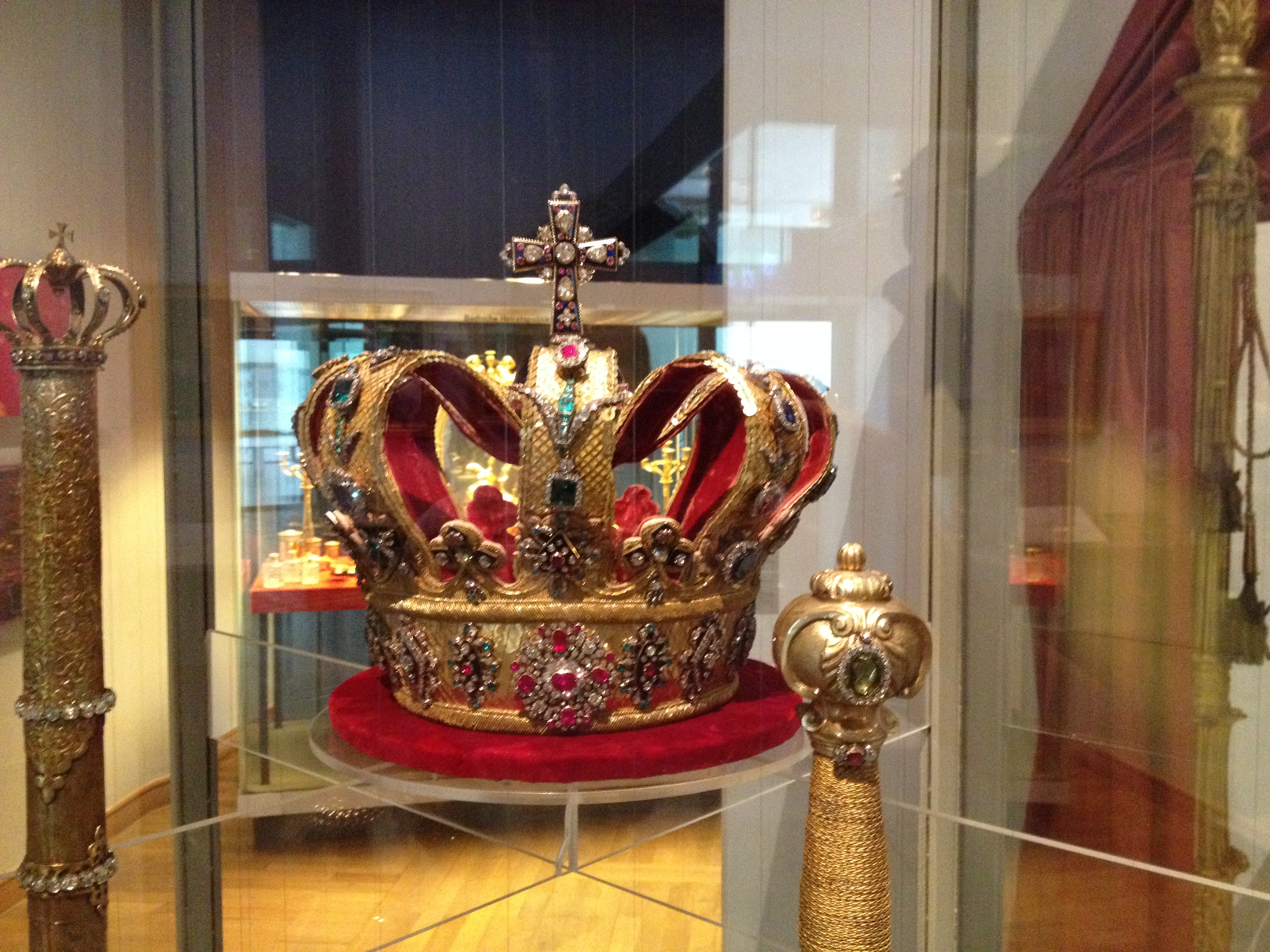
- Crown of Baden in the Badische Landesmuseum

Details
- Country: Germany
- Made: 1811
- Arches: 8

Crown of Baden (German: die Badische Krone), also known as the Grand Ducal Crown of Baden (Großherzoglich badische Krone) is a crown formerly used by the Grand Duke of Baden and part of the Crown Jewels of Baden. The crown is 26 cm high and has a diameter of 13,8 cm. Today the crown is kept at the Baden State Museum (German: Badisches Landesmuseum), which itself was built within the old walls of the former Karlsruhe Palace.

Charles Frederick, Grand Duke of Baden was promoted from margrave to grand duke by Napoleon I, the cousin by marriage of his grandson's wife, Stéphanie de Beauharnais. Having come into a large amount of jewels and precious metals during the secularisation of many churches Karl II ordered a crown, befitting his new title on 20 May 1808. The design of the crown follows the general pattern typical of a European royal crown, but is unique in that the circlet and the arches of the crown are made of gold fabric rather than of a precious metal such as gold or silver-gilt. Charles Frederick died in 1811 before the crown was completed; the persons in charge hurried production of the crown in time for the funeral. The rush is evidenced by the relative simplicity of the crown, and the use of cheap materials in the production such as steel and even Papier-mâché. The aforementioned precious stones which ornament this crown are in metal settings which are attached to this circlet and these arches much like brooches pinned to fabric. At the intersection of the four arches of this crown is a blue enameled orb and a cross both set with diamonds. The cap on the inside of the crown is made of the same crimson velvet which also covers the reverse sides of the arches of the crown. The crown was never worn by any of the grand dukes.
