= German Phono Museum =

Museum in Germany

- Deutsche Phonomuseum
- Location within Baden-Württemberg Location within Germany
- Established: 15 July 2011
- Location: Sankt Georgen im Schwarzwald, Deutschland
- Coordinates: 48.1255°N 8.3320°E
- Visitors: 5000
- Website: www.deutsches-phono-museum.de

The German Phono Museum (German: Deutsche Phonomuseum) is a museum in Baden-Württemberg in the town of Sankt Georgen im Schwarzwald.

The museum portrays the history of the music industry, beginning with phonographs and continuing right up to the modern CD. In the museum, in addition to old record players that were produced by local firms, Dual and Perpetuum-Ebner (PE), there are gramophones, which were the predecessors of the record player. Television sets from the 1930s to the 1960s, and more recent devices such as portable cassette players and the Walkman, and video recording equipment such as VHS and Betamax recorders, as well as professional radio and television equipment are also exhibited.

The museum was opened for the first time on 15 July 2011, and in 2015, there were about 5000 visitors. The museum is located in the former department store, Brigau. It is open from Tuesday to Sunday. Group guided tours may be booked in advance.

== See also ==
- List of museums in Germany
- List of music museums
