= Erinnerungsstätte für die Freiheitsbewegungen in der deutschen Geschichte =

Museum in Rastatt, Germany

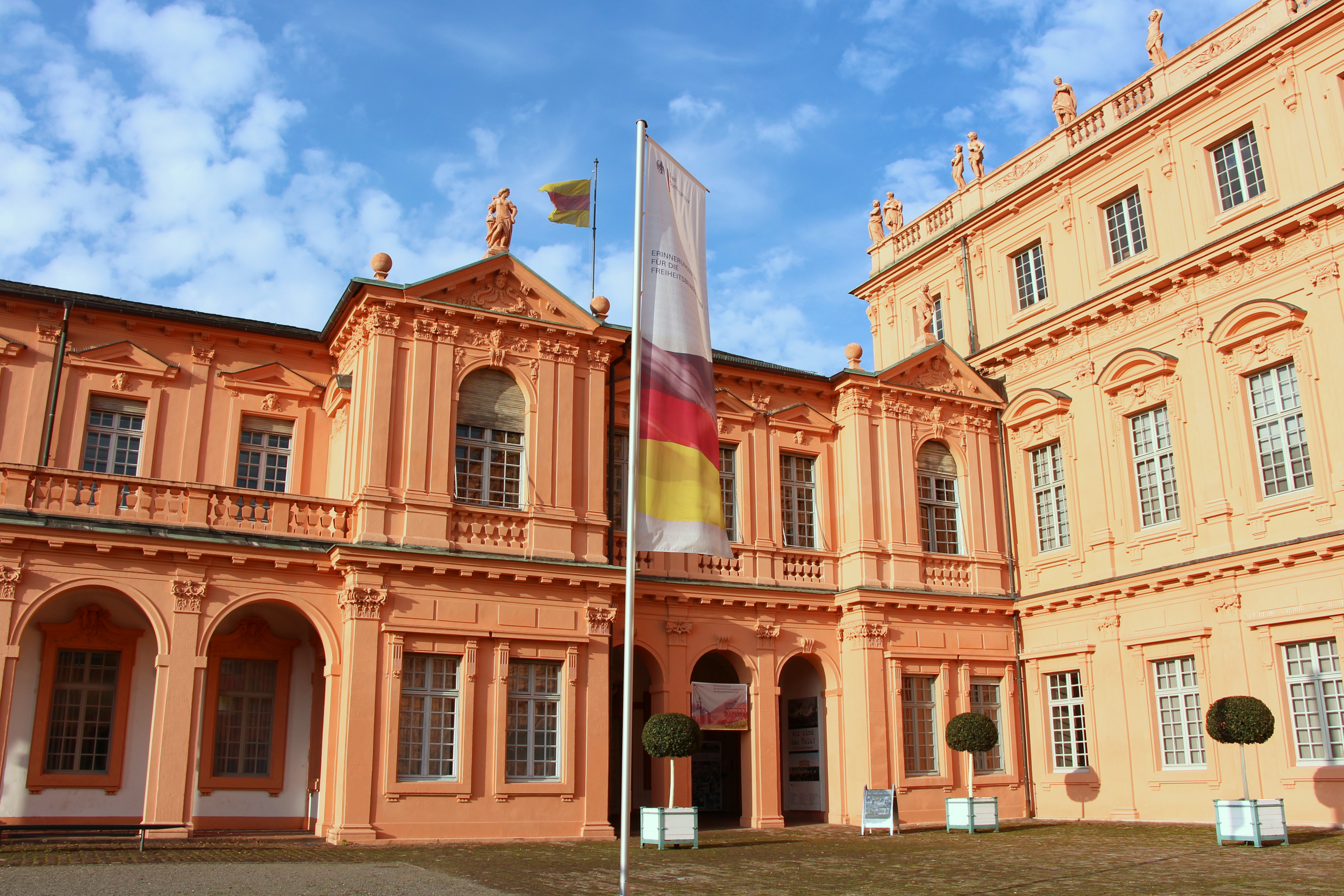
- Location: Germany
- Coordinates: 48°51′31″N 8°12′16″E
- Location of Erinnerungsstätte für die Freiheitsbewegungen in der deutschen Geschichte

The Erinnerungsstätte für die Freiheitsbewegungen in der deutschen Geschichte (literally Memorial site for freedom movements in German history) is a museum and memorial to free democratic traditions in Germany. It is housed in the Schloss Rastatt (chosen due to the town of Rastatt being a key site in the Baden Revolution and the Revolutions of 1848 in the German states) and known as the Freiheitsmuseum (Freedom Museum) for short.

It was opened on 26 June 1974 by president Gustav Heinemann. It is overseen and owned by the German Federal Archives and is a central stopping-point on the 'Democracy Way' from Frankfurt to Lörrach. It has also mounted exhibitions on various topics, with permanent displays on:

- Freedom movements in the early modern period
- Social issues
- Between Two Revolutions: 1789–1848
- The March Revolution 1848
- Die Deutsche Nationalversammlung 1848/49
- Fundamental rights
- The Struggle on the Reichsverfassung 1849
- The long road to democracy: 1850–1918
- Freedom-fighters who emigrated
- Germany 1918–1945 - Resistance in Nazi Germany
- The "Weiße Rose"
- Germany 1945–1990 - Resistance in the Soviet Zone and East Germany
- Gustav W. Heinemann and Rastatt
