= Democracy Way =

Tourist trail in Germany

The Democracy Way (Straße der Demokratie) is a 280 km long tourist trail between Freiburg im Breisgau and Frankfurt am Main, made up of sites linked to development of democracy in the area during the revolutions of 1848 in the German states.
