= Schüttesäge Museum =

Museum in Schiltach, Germany

Coordinates: 48°17′25.6″N 8°20′37.6″E

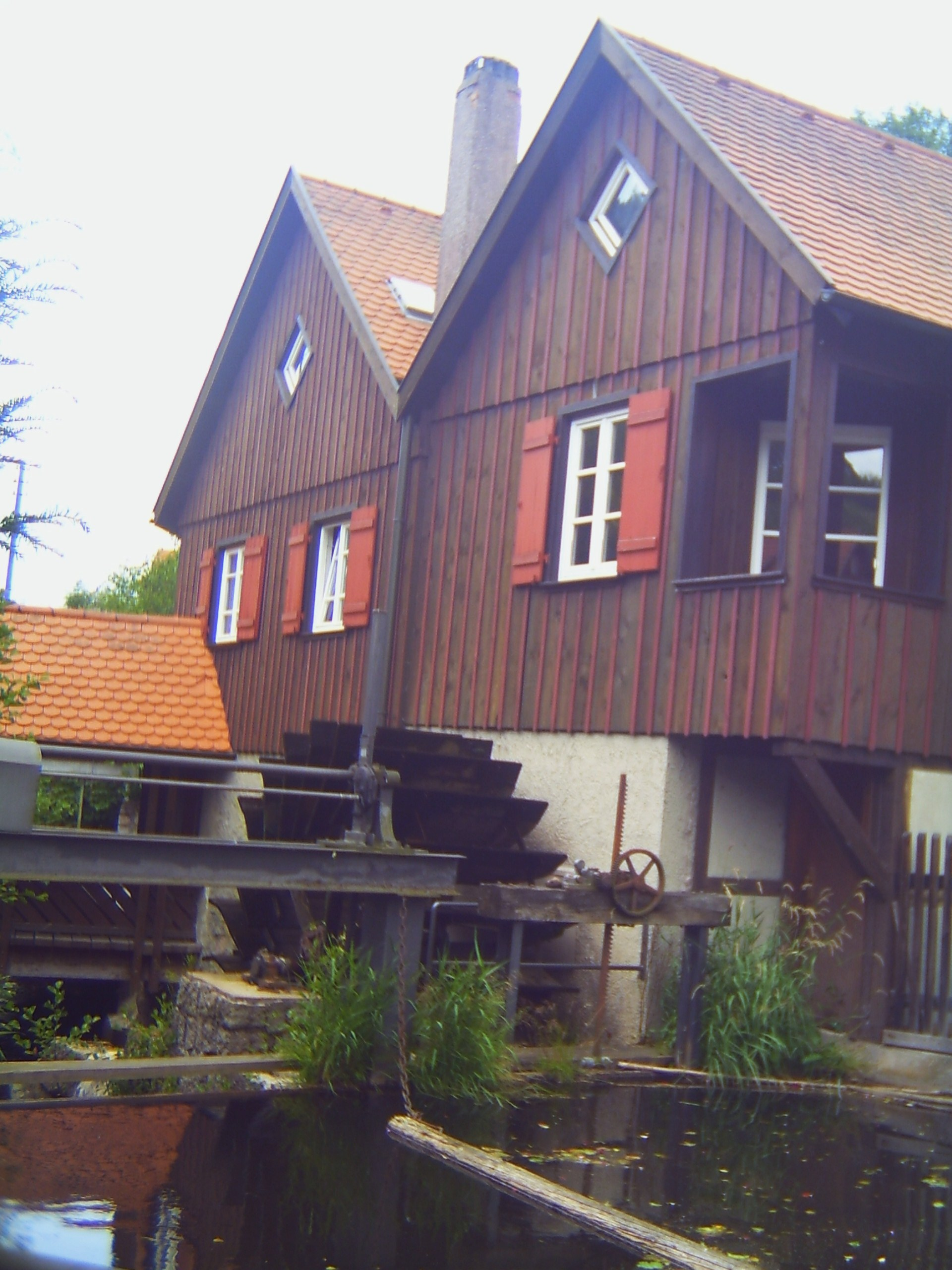
Schüttesäge Museum

Schüttesäge Museum, Schiltach, Baden-Württemberg

The Schüttesäge Museum is a museum in the town of Schiltach in the Black Forest. It is located in the county of Rottweil in the German federal state of Baden-Württemberg. The museum has exhibits on the themes of forestry, tanning and timber rafting in Schiltach and the surrounding area in the Upper Kinzig valley.

== History ==
The former church sawmill (Kirchensäge), later called the Schütte Sawmill (Schüttesäge), (its owner was the publican of the zur Schütte inn in Wolfach), was first mentioned at this site in 1491. It was operated as a sawmill until 1931. Today it still has an undershot water wheel with a diameter of 7.20 metres that still drives the transmission machinery. The water-powered facility is a protected monument. The museum was opened in 1989 by the town of Schiltach.

=== Forest economy ===
The museum portrays the forestry industry and the working of wood, its use in timber-framed construction, its link to timber rafting (the manufacture of rafts from wood) and its link to the tanning industry (bark collection for the red tanners).

=== Timber rafting ===
Timber rafting was a major source of income for Schiltach until the 19th century. The museum depicts the life of the rafters with photographs of the period and other contemporary documents, tools of the trade, work clothing, etc. There is an explanation of what was meant by a Gestörfloß and how it was made.

=== Tanning ===
Tanning was another important source of income in Schiltach, and there is still a white tannery there today. The various tanning technologies are portrayed, especially red tanning in the context of forestry, as well as tools and the history of Schiltach's tanning families. An outside area on the theme of tanning enhances the exhibition.
