= Badisches Landesmuseum =

Coordinates: 49.0136°N 8.4044°E

Baden State Museum
- Badisches Landesmuseum
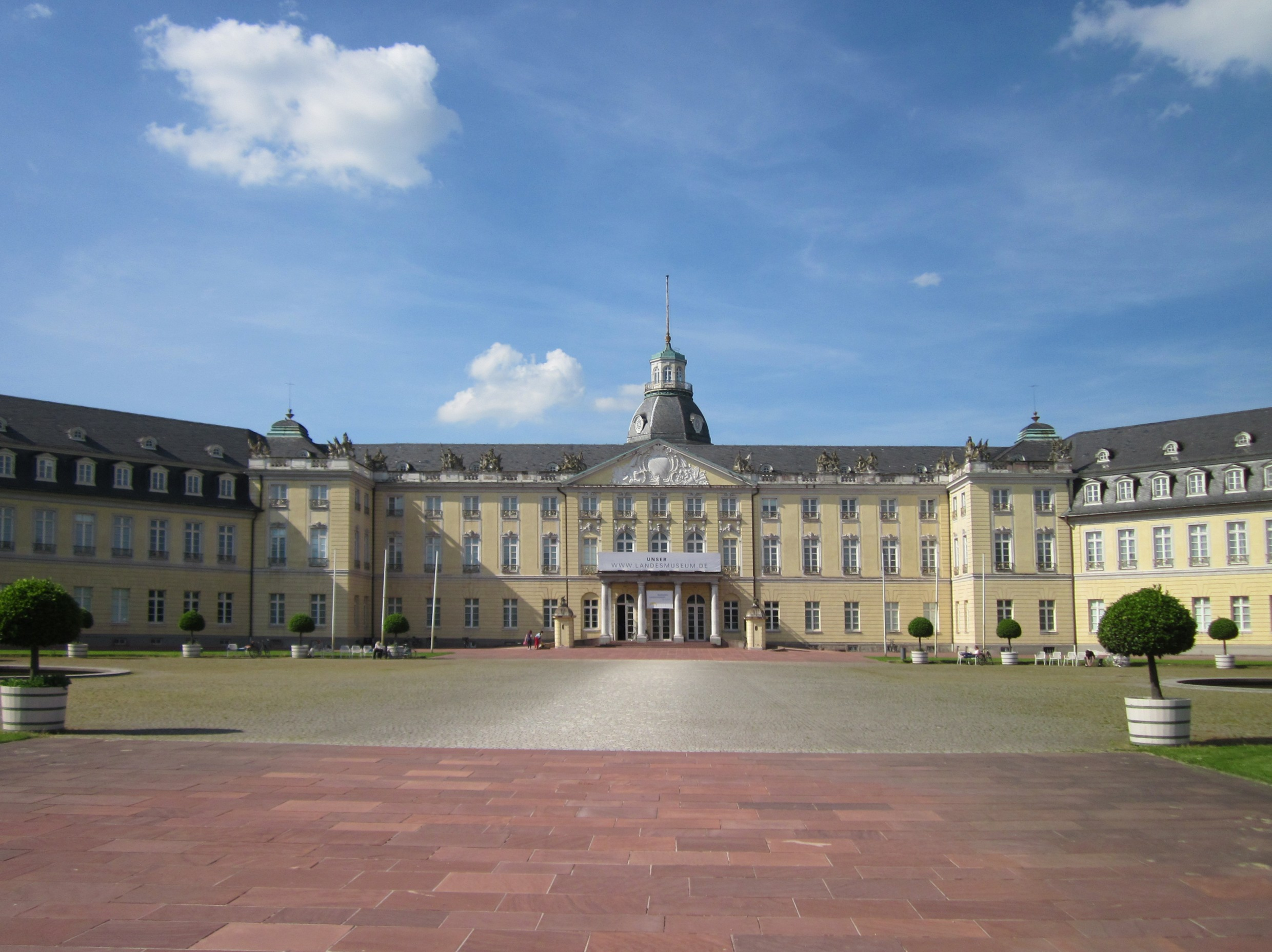
- Karlsruhe Palace, home of the Baden State Museum
- Established: 1921, Reopened in 1959
- Location: Karlsruhe, Germany
- Type: Museum of culture, art and regional history
- Visitors: 257.166 (2019)
- Executive director: Eckart Köhne
- Owner: State of Baden-Württemberg
- Website: www.landesmuseum.de

The Baden State Museum (German: Badisches Landesmuseum) in Karlsruhe is the large cultural, art and regional history museum of the Baden region of Baden-Württemberg . With its globally significant collections, representing more than 50,000 years of international cultural history, it conveys history and historical living environments. Its collections range from prehistory and early history to the Middle Ages and the 21st century. The museum was founded in 1919 and opened in 1921 in the rooms of Karlsruhe Palace.

== History ==
In 1873, Frederick I. had a Collection Building built on Friedrichsplatz for his library and his extensive collections. Here they were open to the public as the Grand Ducal Collection of Antiquities and Ethnology in Karlsruhe. After the Abdication of the Grand Duke of Baden Frederick II., the Karlsruhe Palace, located in the center of the baroque city complex, was taken over by the Baden state in 1918 and designated as the seat of a newly founded cultural history museum.

The museum was founded in 1919 and was created by merging the "antiquities collection" with the Baden Museum of Decorative Arts. It was opened on 24 July 1921 in the rooms of the palace. Hans Rott was the first director until 1938. In 1936, the ‘Baden coin collection‘(Badisches Münzkabinett) was incorporated into the museum. The director was Friedrich Wielandt until 1971. Karlsruhe Palace was destroyed in 1944 during the Second World War. Most of the museum's holdings were saved. Reconstruction of the burnt-out palace began in 1955. The exterior was faithfully reconstructed, while the interior was designed to meet the requirements of a modern museum. The Baden State Museum was reopened in 1959 and the castle café opened in 1965. Jürgen Thimme was the first archaeologist to head the antiquities department from 1959 to 1982. From 1992, under the direction of Harald Siebenmorgen, all fifteen departments of the Baden State Museum were successively completely refurnished according to a concept based on contextualization and staging of the objects, most recently the "World Culture" department in 2013. All departments were made accessible through collection guides. From 1992, large museum festivals were organized, and the Baden State Museum was opened to a wide audience through numerous other museum education and cultural mediation measures. A high-calibre and closely timed special exhibition program, which was partly based on the newly concluded cooperation agreements with Tunisia, Algeria and other Mediterranean countries, attracted international attention. The number of visitors quadrupled. In 2009, the Baden State Museum Karlsruhe had around 300,000 visitors. As a pilot project, the Baden State Museum was the first museum in Baden-Württemberg to introduce a business management structure with a commercial directorate, thus gaining new scope for action. In 2014, the German Museum of Music Automatons in Bruchsal and the museum in Salem were opened with new concepts.

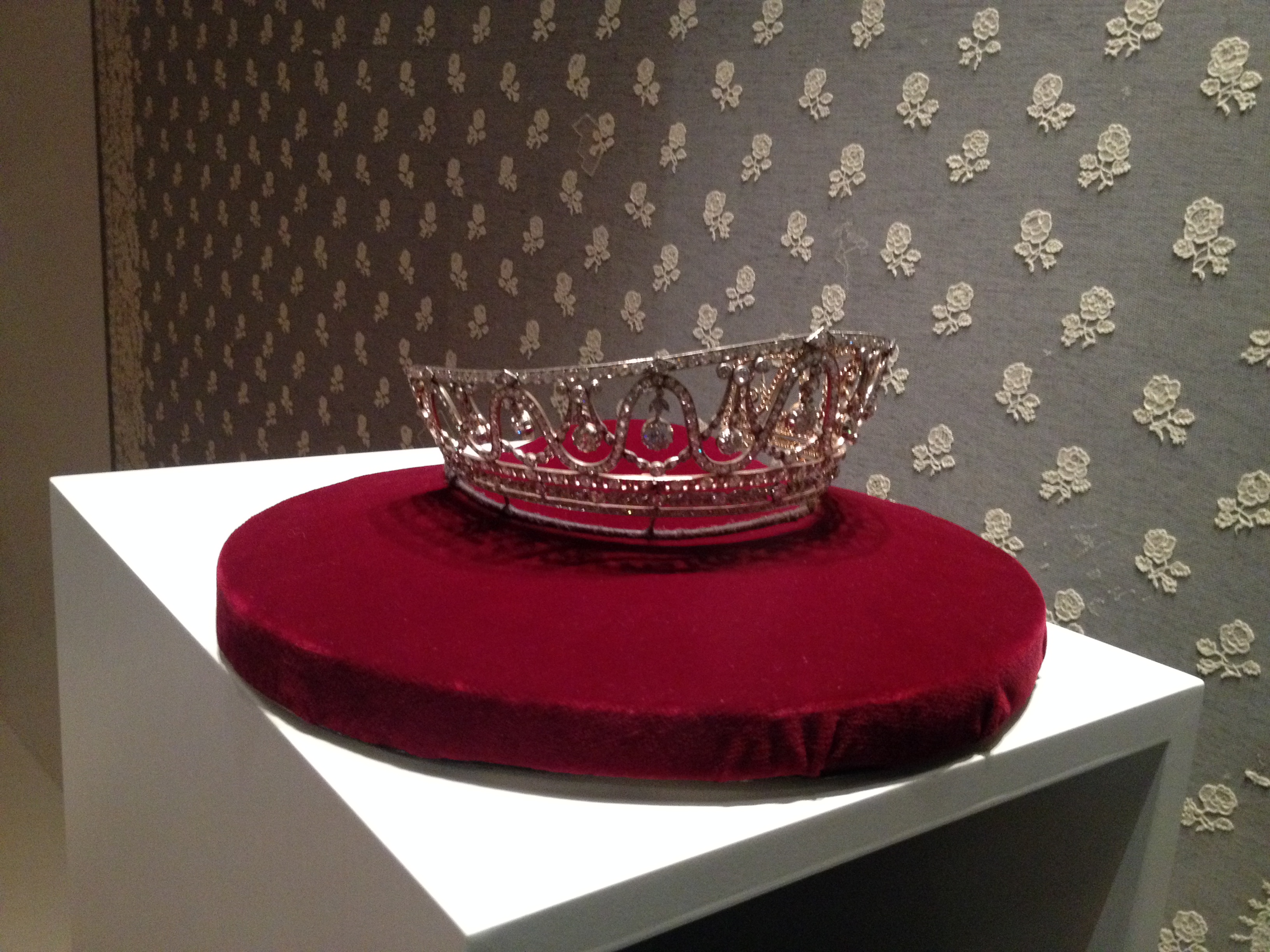
Diadem of Grand Duchess Hilda of Baden

At the end of April 2017, a diadem of Grand Duchess Hilda of Baden made of gold and platinum by the Baden court jeweler Schmidt-Staub around 1907 and set with 367 diamonds was stolen from a display case in the throne room on the second floor of the museum. As it became known in June 2017, a theft had already taken place in October 2016. It was an ivory sculpture from 1620 worth 500,000 euros by the sculptor Leonhard Kern. It shows the Roman woman Fulvia with the severed head of Cicero. The public prosecutor saw no connection between the two incidents.

In 2019, the museum celebrated its 100th anniversary with a large museum festival.

From 2027, the museum in Karlsruhe Palace will be closed for several years due to a general refurbishment. This is necessary as much of the building technology dates back to the 1960s.

Directors

- Hans Rott (1919-1938)
- Ludwig Moser (1938-1945)
- Arthur von Schneider (1945-1952)
- Rudolf Schnellbach (1952-1967)
- Ernst Petrasch (1967-1981)
- Volker Himmelein (1982-1991)
- Harald Siebenmorgen (1992-2014)
- Eckart Köhne (since 1 July 2014).

== Collection exhibitions ==
The various collections can be seen partly in the Karlsruhe Palace and partly in several branch museums.

=== Karlsruhe Palace ===
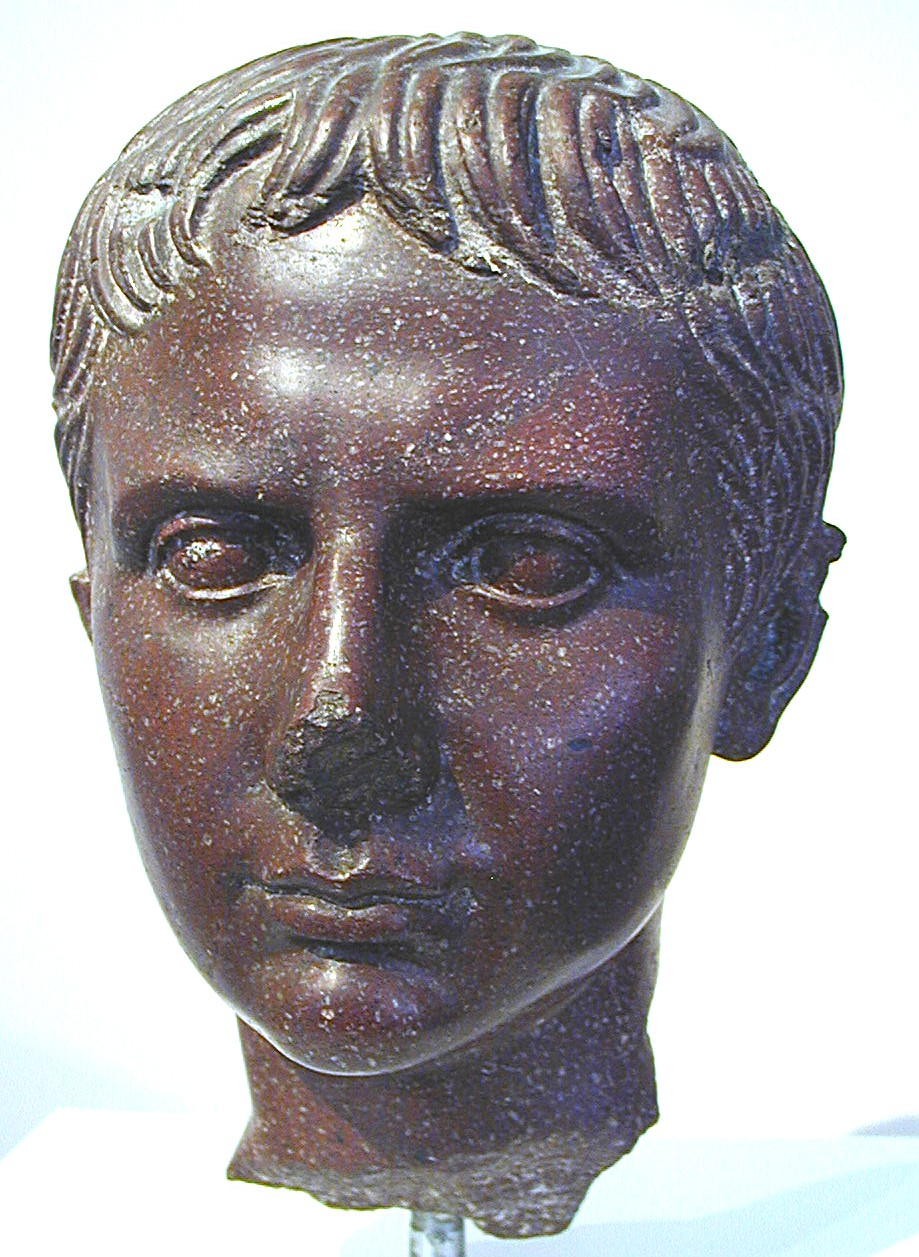
Gaius Cäsar in the Baden State Museum

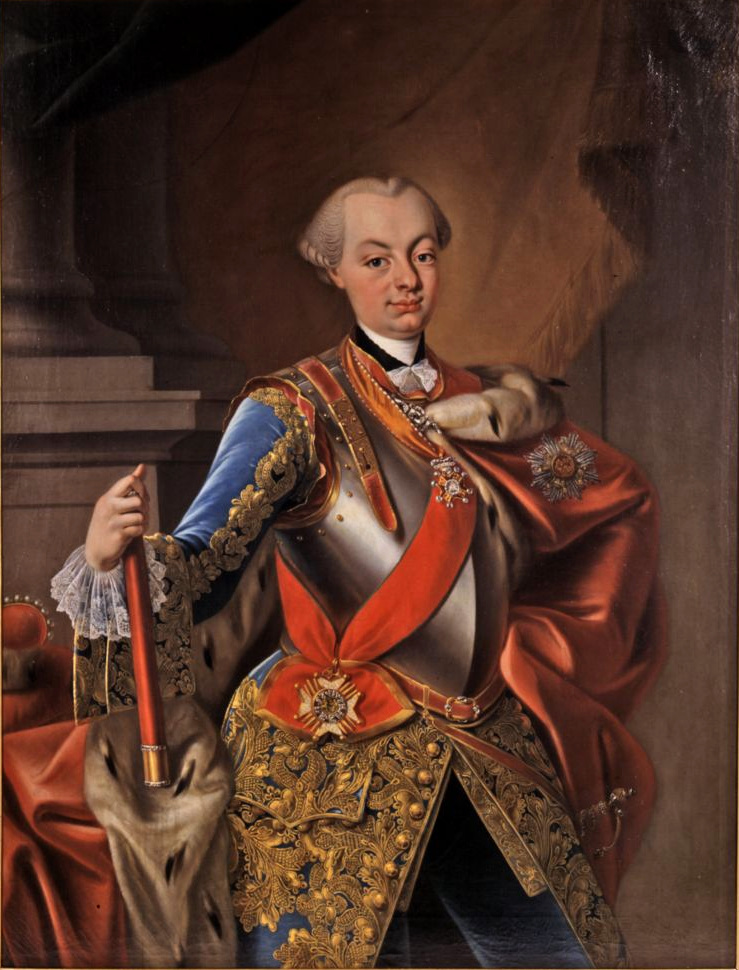
Charles Frederick of Baden in the Baden State Museum

The museum's collections are presented on four floors in Karlsruhe Palace. The most important antiquities collection in Baden-Württemberg and the Karlsruhe Turkish booty, most of which Margrave Ludwig Wilhelm von Baden brought back from the Turkish Wars in 1691, are well known. To mark the 100th anniversary of its founding, the latest exhibition of the collection, Archaeology in Baden - Expothek¹, was opened in July 2019.

The departments in the palace include:

==== In the basement ====
Archaeology in Baden - Expothek¹: Vessels, weapons, tools and jewelry from the early cultural history of Baden from the Palaeolithic period (approx. 650,000 BC) to the Carolingian period (8th century AD). The collection exhibition is a pilot project for the new museum concept of the Baden State Museum and offers digital research tools and virtual reality. The Expothek at the center of the exhibition resembles a research laboratory. Here, registered users can have original objects presented to them by trained staff by prior appointment.

History of the Romans on the Upper Rhine: Roman culture and way of life on the Upper Rhine. Mithras relief and cellar of a Roman villa.

==== On the first floor ====
Ancient cultures of the Mediterranean region I and II: Exhibits from the ancient Greek and Roman cultures. Etruscans, Lower Italy and Sicily. Furnishings from Roman villas. Early Christian Byzantine objects.

==== On the second floor ====
- Late Middle Ages: Classes in the Middle Ages (nobles, burghers and peasants).
- Renaissance and Early Baroque: From the Reformation to the Wars of Succession. Sculptures.
- Karlsruhe Palace and Court: Building history of the palace, street system. Portraits of the princes of the House of Baden who reigned from 1715 to 1918. Insignia. Gifts to the House of Baden.
- Armory: Slashing, stabbing and firearms are exhibited in the armory.
- "So-called Turkish booty":' Equipment from the time of the Turkish Wars. Weapons, riding gear and armor.

==== On the second floor ====
- Weltkultur/ Global Culture: The theme is the mutual influence of European and non-European cultures and the role of mediating cultures. There are collaborations with museums in Tunisia, Algeria, Turkey, Greece, Italy and France.
- Baden and Europe (1789 to today): The permanent exhibition features showpieces on the history of Baden from 1789 to the present day, including Napoleon, Grand Duke Charles Frederick and revolutionary Friedrich Hecker.

==== Service facilities ====
The museum has a reference library for the collection areas and exhibition themes, a museum store and the "Schlosscafé" with Baden specialties.

=== Branch offices and museums ===
In addition to the palace, the Baden State Museum has eight branch offices and museums.

- Museum at the market(Museum beim Markt), Karlsruhe
  The Museum at the market houses the comprehensive collections of applied art since 1900. Works from the most important centers of European Art Nouveau, from the Deutscher Werkbund and the Bauhaus as well as from the twenties and thirties are on display. Contemporary design testimonies are represented by artists such as Jasper Morrison and many others.
- Museum in the Majolika, Karlsruhe
  The Museum in the Majolica documents the history of the important Karlsruhe majolica manufactory from its foundation in 1901 to the recent past. Throughout its existence, this production site has reacted to almost all art-historical trends and cultural-historical events. The products on display therefore reflect the artistic and cultural-historical changes of the past century.
- German Museum of Music Automatons, Bruchsal
  The German Museum of Music Automatons was reopened in 2014 with a completely new presentation. Around 500 exhibits at the German Music Automaton Museum in Bruchsal Castle show the development of music automatons from their production in the 17th and 18th centuries through their heyday at the end of the 19th century to their decline during the Great Depression in the 1920s.
- Staufen Ceramics Museum, Staufen im Breisgau
  The museum was set up in the former house with a pottery workshop, which provides an insight into the everyday work processes of the pottery trade with a clay pit, potter's wheel, glaze mill and two wood-fired kilns. In addition to the collection of works by the former owners and Elisabeth Winter-Bonn, the museum offers several temporary exhibitions a year, including contemporary ceramics.
- Außenstelle Südbaden (South Baden branch office), Staufen im Breisgau
  The South Baden branch office, which emerged from the former State Office for Folklore, is also based in Staufen. It is responsible for the interests of the Baden State Museum in South Baden, for the Staufen Ceramics Museum and maintains a public library and a photo archive on the subject of folklore.
- Neuenbürg castle
  The museum in Neuenbürg Castle shows the fairy tale Das kalte Herz by Wilhelm Hauff in a walk-in production and also presents the past of the castle and its immediate surroundings. The castle cellar is reserved for exhibitions of contemporary art.
- Monastery Museum, Calw-Hirsau
  The Hirsau Monastery Museum near Calw is located next to the ruins of the Hirsau Monastery, one of the most important monasteries of the Middle Ages. The exhibition provides a good insight into the monastic culture of Hirsau, which goes back over 1100 years, the life of the monks and also the local and social history of the spa town of Hirsau in the 19th and 20th centuries.
- Monastery Museum Salem in the Salem Imperial Abbey: The exhibition Masterpieces of the Imperial Abbey with altarpieces and sculptures was opened in 2014.

Noteworthy is the Open Access digital catalog, which offers new access to the collections and provides important information on individual objects.

== Special exhibitions ==
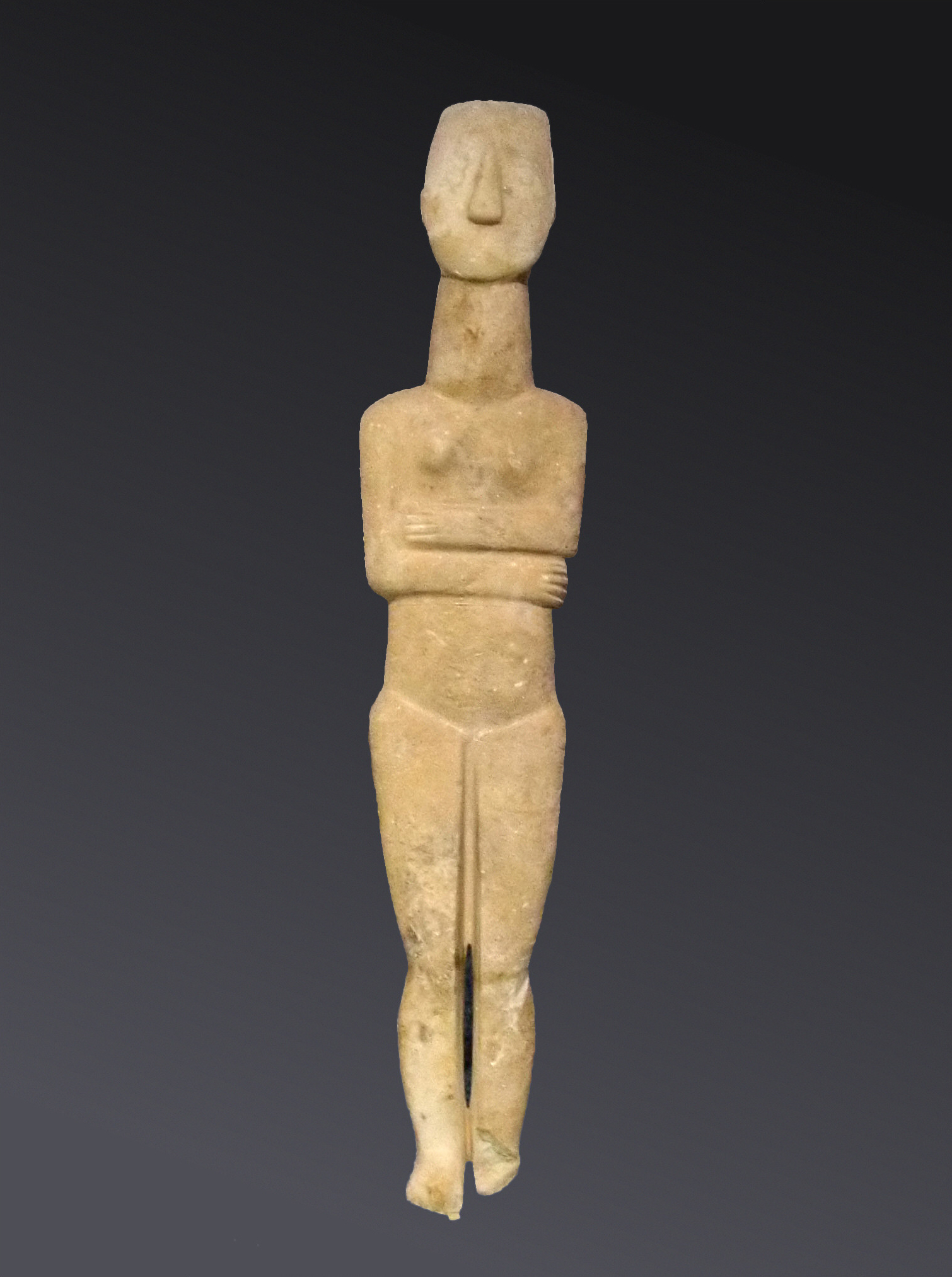
Female Cycladic idol 75/49 in the Baden State Museum, which was restituted in 2014

In addition to its collection exhibitions, the Baden State Museum presents several special exhibitions each year, some of which attract national attention as Large State exhibitions.

- In 1976, under the curator Jürgen Thimme, an exhibition entitled Art and culture of the Cyclades was shown, which consisted largely of acquired stolen goods. For this reason, the Greek Ministry of Culture refused to lend items to the State Museum for the exhibition Cyclades - Lifeworlds of an early Greek culture in 2011. In 2014, the Cycladic Handle Bowl 75/11 and the Female Cycladic Idol 75/49 were restituted to Greece and handed over to the National Museum in Athens.
- In 1980, the exhibition "Art and Culture of Sardinia" followed from the same collection, which is unique in Germany

Large special exhibitions and state exhibitions in the castle from 1992 (each with catalog)

- 1992: Ora pro nobis. Pictorial evidence of late medieval veneration of saints
- 1993: Between school and factory. Women's textile work in Baden in the 19th and 20th centuries
- 1994: A century of furniture for the princely court. Karlsruhe, Mannheim, St. Petersburg 1750 to 1850
- 1994: Witches and witch-hunts in the German southwest.
- 1995: Fascination of a monastery. 750 years of Lichtenthal Abbey
- 1995: Villain or hero? Historical robbers and robber gangs
- 1996: "Saved for Baden". Acquisitions of the Baden State Museum in 1995 from the collections of the Margraves and Grand Dukes of Baden
- 1996: The electrified society
- 1996: Delphi. Oracle at the navel of the world
- 1997: When the red sun rises in Capri... The German longing for Italy in the 20th century
- 1998: 1848/49 Revolution of the German Democrats in Baden (large state exhibition), as well as a traveling exhibition on the subject, in the accompanying program: "Tomorrow we leave". Johannes Grützke paints the Baden Revolution (Museum beim Markt - MbM)
- and black, red and gold. A symbol of the 1848/49 revolution in contemporary art (MbM)
- 1998: In the Shadow of the Pharaoh. The Cult of the Dead in Ancient Egypt
- 1999: Saints, rulers, jumping jacks. Picture arches from Weißenburg
- 1999: Turn of the century 1000-2000. Looking back to the future (large state exhibition)
- 2000: Ernst Ludwig Kirchner - Lise Gujer: Textile Pictures
- 2001: In the labyrinth of Minos. Crete - the first European advanced civilization
- 2001: Late Middle Ages on the Upper Rhine. Everyday life, crafts and trade 1350-1525 (large state exhibition)
- 2002: With 100 things through the history of Baden. Jubilee exhibition to mark the 50th anniversary of the state of Baden-Württemberg
- 2002: The myth of Tutankhamun
- 2003: Good light! The history of photography in Baden 1840-1930
- 2003: We are in old fairy tales... The Song of the Nibelungs and its world
- 2004: Silver Treasure of Switzerland. Gold and silversmithing from the Swiss National Museum
- 2004: Hannibal ad Portas. Power and Wealth of Carthage (large state exhibition)
- 2005: Flight into the past. Archaeological sites in aerial photographs by Georg Gerster
- 2005: IMPERIUM ROMANUM. Romans, Christians, Alamanni (large state exhibition)
- 2007: 12000 years ago in Anatolia. The oldest monuments of mankind. (large state exhibition)
- 2007: Beauty in Ancient Egypt. Longing for perfection
- 2007: Egypt, modernity, the Beuron Art School
- 2008: The time of heroes. The "dark centuries" of Greece 1200-700 B. C.
- 2009: Art Nouveau on the Upper Rhine. Art and life without borders
- 2009: The Kingdom of the Vandals. Heirs of the Empire in North Africa (large state exhibition)
- 2010: From Minnesang to the Pop Academy. Music culture in Baden-Württemberg (large state exhibition)
- 2010: "Neolithic Age in upheaval." The Michelsberg culture and Central Europe 6000 years ago
- 2011: Stained glass of the modern age. Fascination of color in backlight
- 2011: Cyclades. Lifeworlds of an early Greek culture
- 2012: Baden! 900 years. Stories of a land (large state exhibition)
- 2013: Empire of the Gods. Isis - Mithras - Christ. Cults and religions in the Roman Empire
- 2014: The Council of Constance. World event of the Middle Ages 1414-1418 (large state exhibition in Constance)
- 2016/2017: Ramses - Divine Ruler on the Nile
- 2017/2018: The Etruscans - World Culture in Ancient Italy
- 2018/2019: Mycenae - The legendary world of Agamemnon
- 2019/2020: Emperor and Sultan - Neighbors in the Middle of Europe 1600-1700
- 2021/2022: Goddesses of the Art Nouveau.

== Activities in public ==
- Museum festival, since 1992
- Long museum nights, for special exhibitions
- Events in the museum outside opening hours
- Karlsruhe Museum Night (KAMUNA)
- International Museum Day
- Participation in the biennial city birthday
- Museum educational events and projects

== Collections on the Internet ==
With the digital catalog, the Baden State Museum provides new access to its collections. The offer is constantly being expanded and more and more objects can be researched.

== See also ==
- List of museums in Baden-Württemberg

== Literature ==
- Harald Siebenmorgen: Museen neu denken! Scientific contributions and museum policy theses 1992-2014. ed. Badisches Landesmuseum Karlsruhe 2014.
- Harald Siebenmorgen: Large exhibitions - why? The exhibition concept of the Badisches Landesmuseum. In: A look into history. Karlsruher stadthistorische Beiträge. d. 4 2003-2008. Karlsruhe 2009 (June 18, 2004), pp. 51-55.
- Harald Siebenmorgen: Farewell to illusions. The premise of "Rethinking Museums". In: Rethinking museums. Perspectives on cultural mediation and target group work. Edited by Hartmut John and Anja Dauschek. Bielefeld 2008, pp. 268-275.
- Harald Siebenmorgen: Große Landesausstellungen. In: Making ideas possible! 30 years of the Baden-Württemberg Ministry of Science, Research and the Arts 1978-2008. Edited by the Ministry of Science, Research and the Arts Baden-Württemberg, Stuttgart 2008, pp. 36-38.
- Harald Siebenmorgen: Expectations of the Badisches Landesmuseum for the next generation of academics. In: Museumskunde, vol. 70, 2005, issue 2, pp. 46-47.
- Harald Siebenmorgen: Zur Lage der deutschen Museen. Case report: the Baden State Museum in Karlsruhe. In: Kunstchronik. Monatsschrift für Kunstwissenschaft, Museumswesen und Denkmalpflege, vol. 57, 2004, issue 7, pp. 308-309.
- Harald Siebenmorgen: Museums in intercultural dialog - introduction. In: Museums as forums for the mediation of foreign cultures. Ed. by the State Office for Museum Support Baden-Württemberg in cooperation with the Museumsverband Baden-Württemberg e.V. Stuttgart 2004, pp. 109-112.
- Harald Siebenmorgen: Neue Berufsbilder, neues Selbstbewußtsein: das Museums(selbst)verständnis im Wandel. In: Museumsblatt. Mitteilungen aus dem Museumswesen Baden-Württembergs. 2004, Issue 37, pp. 7-9.
- Harald Siebenmorgen: Die Zukunft der Museen - Eine Podiumsdiskussion im Badischen Landesmuseum Karlsruhe am 9. Februar 2000. In: Museumsblatt. Mitteilungen aus dem Museumswesen Baden-Württembergs, 2000, issue 28, pp. 21-28.
- Harald Siebenmorgen: Archaeology in the Baden State Museum. In: Museumsblatt. Mitteilungen aus dem Museumswesen Baden-Württembergs. 1999, issue 27, pp. 8-10.
- Harald Siebenmorgen: Die Antikenabteilung des Badischen Landesmuseums. In: Mitteilungen des Deutschen Archäologen-Verbandes. Vol. 30, 1999, pp. 34-35.
- Harald Siebenmorgen: Art history as a profession in the museum on the defensive? In: Kunstchronik. Monatsschrift für Kunstwissenschaft, Museumswesen und Denkmalpflege, vol. 52, 1999, pp. 343-346.
- Harald Siebenmorgen: Die zweite "Museumsrevolution" - Aspekte eines dualen Museumsselbstverständnisse. In: Museumsblatt. Mitteilungen aus dem Museumswesen Baden-Württembergs. 1997, Issue 22, pp. 5-9.
- Harald Siebenmorgen: "The" visitor does not exist. Exhibition architecture in the museum. In: Designer. Magazin für Wirtschaft, Kultur und Gesellschaft. Stuttgart 1996, p. 28.
- Badisches Landesmuseum Karlsruhe (ed.): Baden in Geschichte. Brochure. ca. 2014.
- Ulrike Grimm: The Baden State Museum in Karlsruhe. On the history of its collections. Braun, Karlsruhe 1993, ISBN 3-7650-9036-0.
- Numerous catalogs on the collections of the Badisches Landesmuseum as well as publications on special exhibitions.
