= Karlsruhe Palace =

German palace in Baden-Württemberg

Coordinates: 49.0136°N 8.4044°E

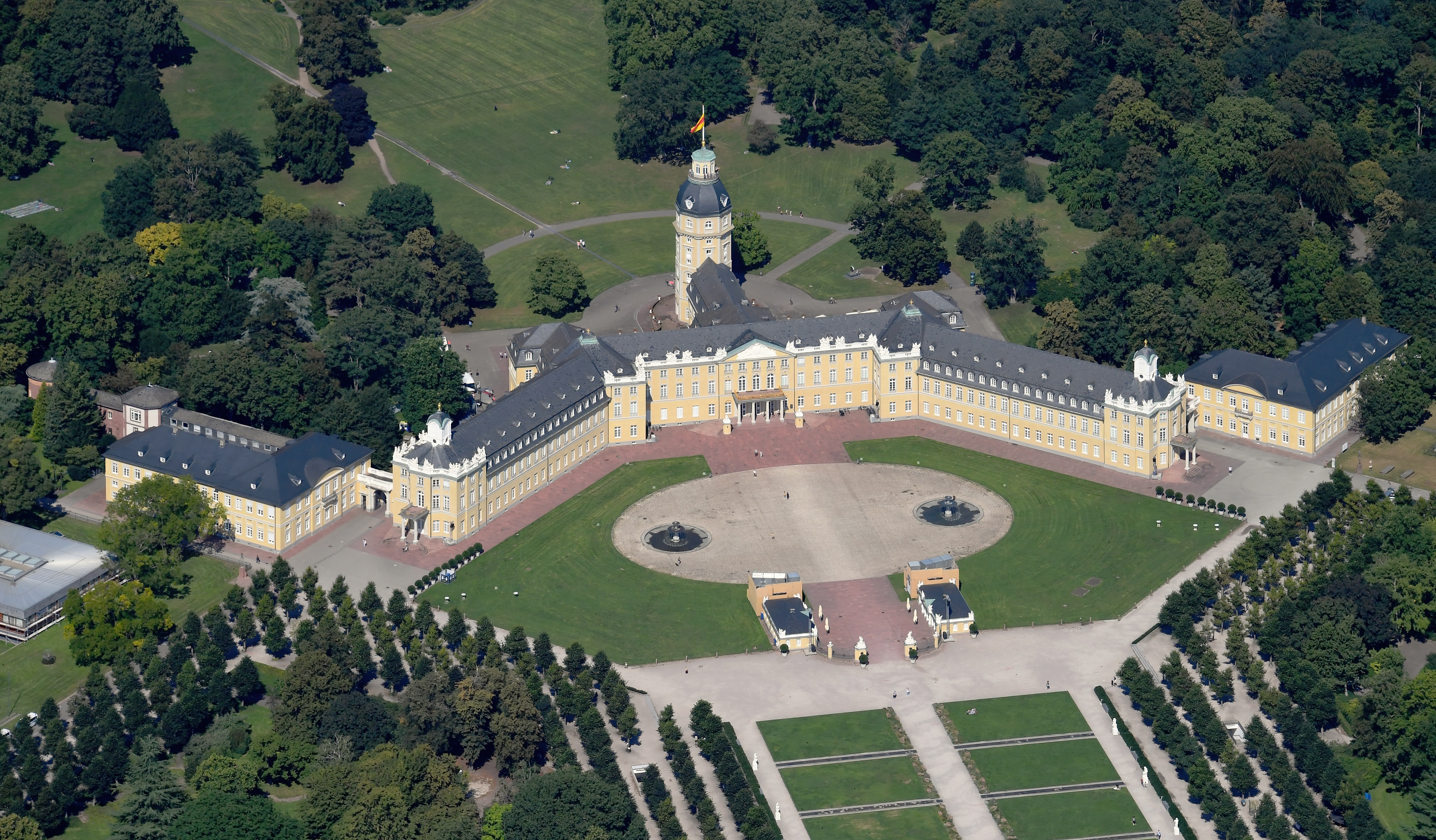
Aerial image of Karlsruhe Palace

Karlsruhe Palace

Karlsruhe Palace (German: Karlsruher Schloss) was built in 1715 for Margrave Charles III William of Baden-Durlach after a dispute with the citizens of his previous capital, Durlach. The city of Karlsruhe has since grown around it. The building is now home to the main museum of the Badisches Landesmuseum.

== History ==
The first building was constructed by Jakob Friedrich von Batzendorf. The city was planned with the tower of the palace (Schloss) at the centre and 32 streets radiating out from it like spokes on a wheel, or ribs on a folding fan, so that a nickname for Karlsruhe in German is the "fan city" (Fächerstadt).

Originally partially made of wood, the palace had to be rebuilt in 1746, using stone. Charles Frederick, Margrave of Baden-Durlach at the time and who eventually became Charles Frederick, Grand Duke of Baden, then had the palace altered by Balthasar Neumann and Friedrich von Kesslau until 1770, adding larger windows and doors, pavilions and wings. In 1785, Wilhelm Jeremias Müller shortened the tower, adding a cupola.

During the Revolutions of 1848, Leopold, Grand Duke of Baden, was expelled in 1849 for some time. In 1918, the last monarch, Frederick II, Grand Duke of Baden, had to move out. The former residence of the rulers of Baden is now used as the Badisches Landesmuseum Karlsruhe.

Much of the city centre, including the palace, was reduced to rubble by Allied bombing during World War II but was quickly rebuilt after the war.

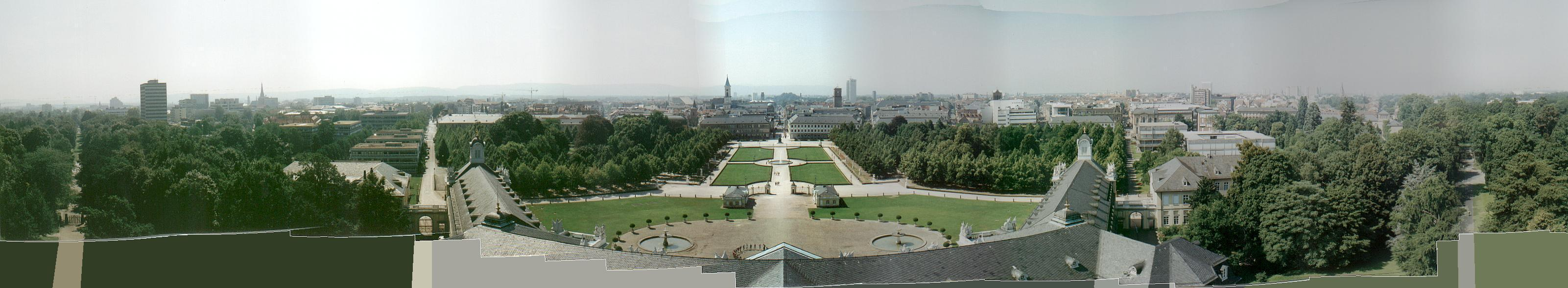
Panorama of Karlsruhe from the tower of the palace, looking south. The University is at left, the Marketplace at centre, Federal Constitutional Court at right. Note wings of palace aligning with streets, all radiating out from centre of town (i.e. the palace tower).

180 degrees panorama from atop the tower, facing north

== Gallery ==
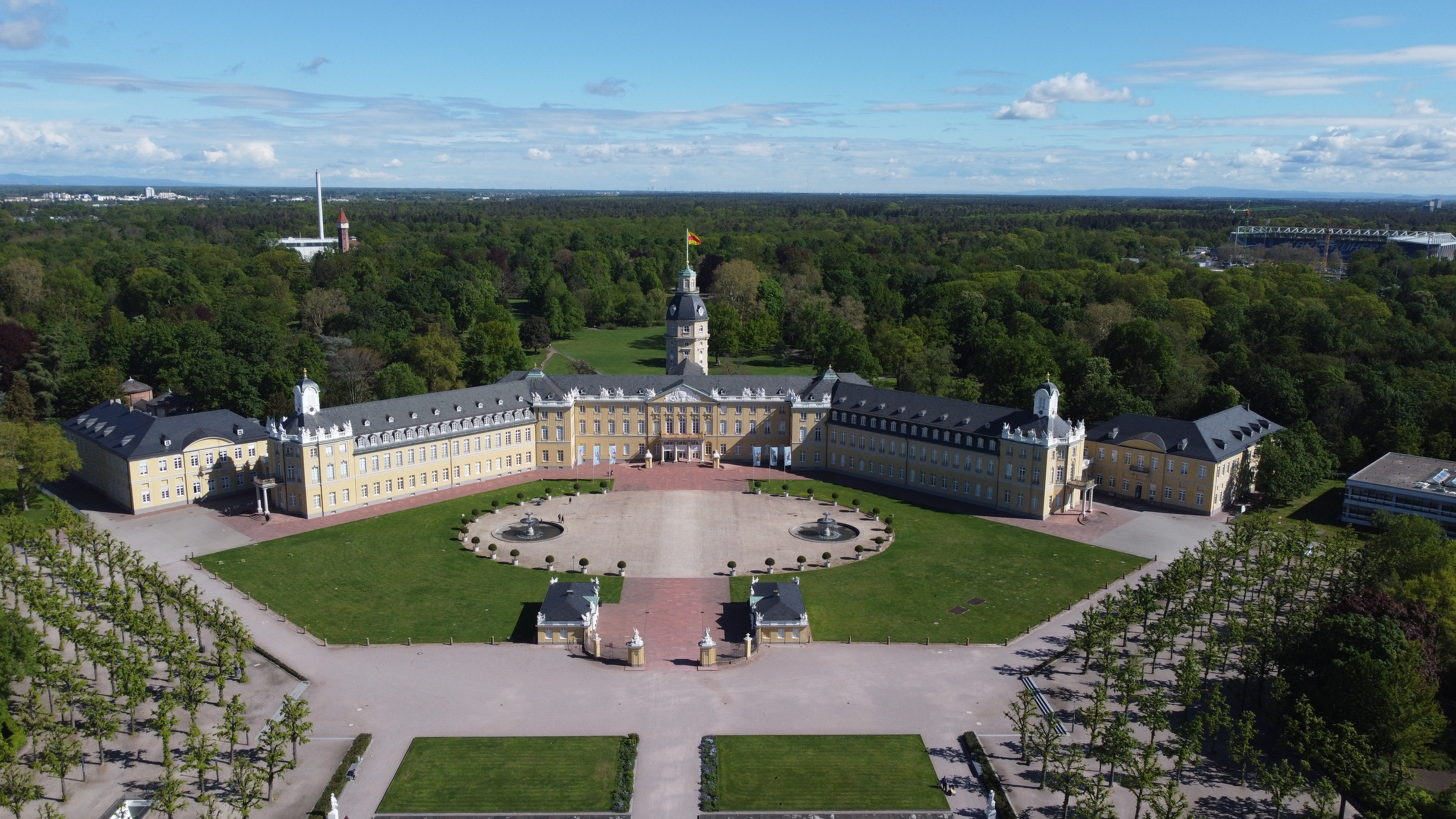
Karlsruhe Palace, drone view from front

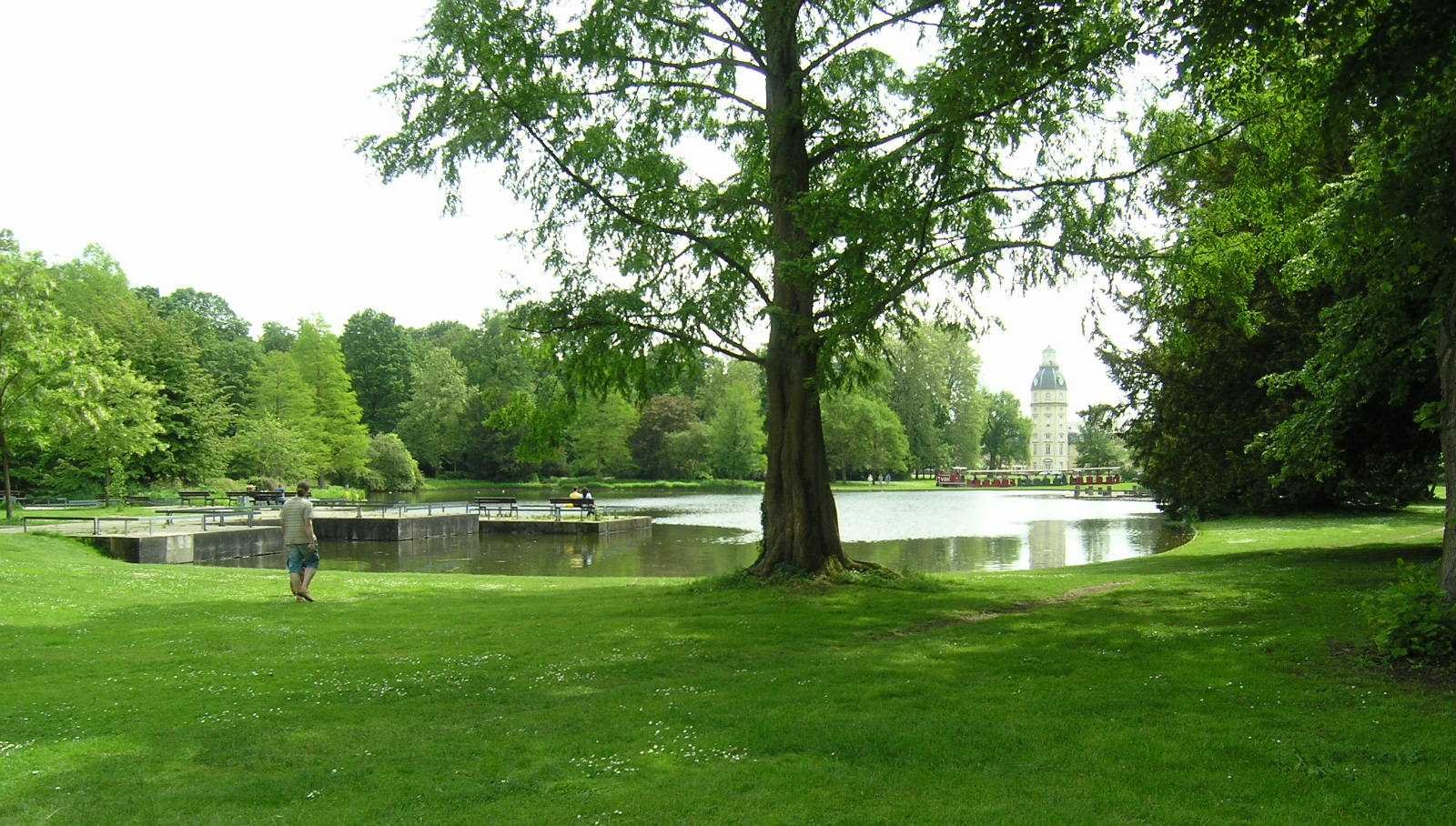
Schlossgarten

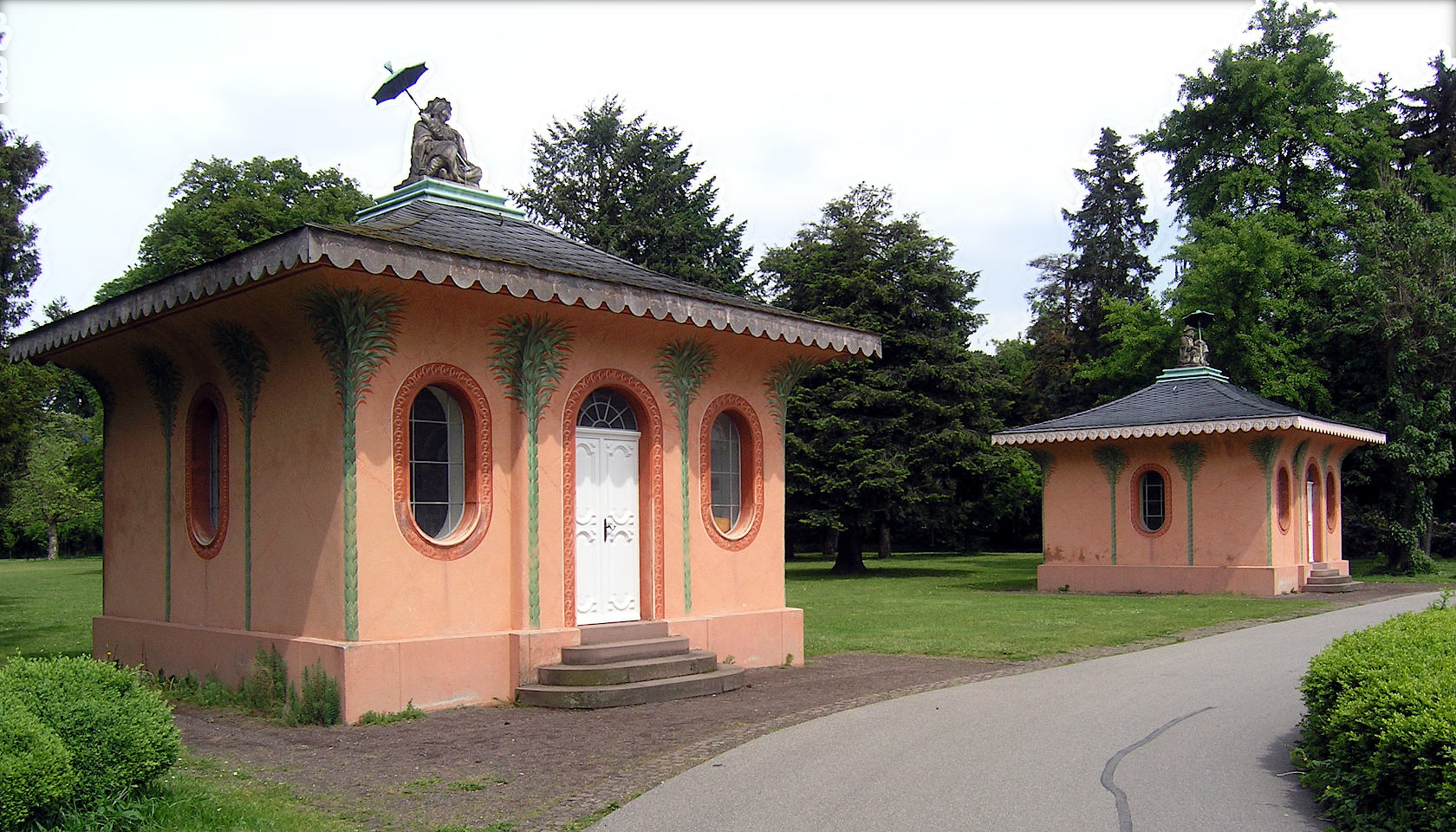
Chinese Tea huts

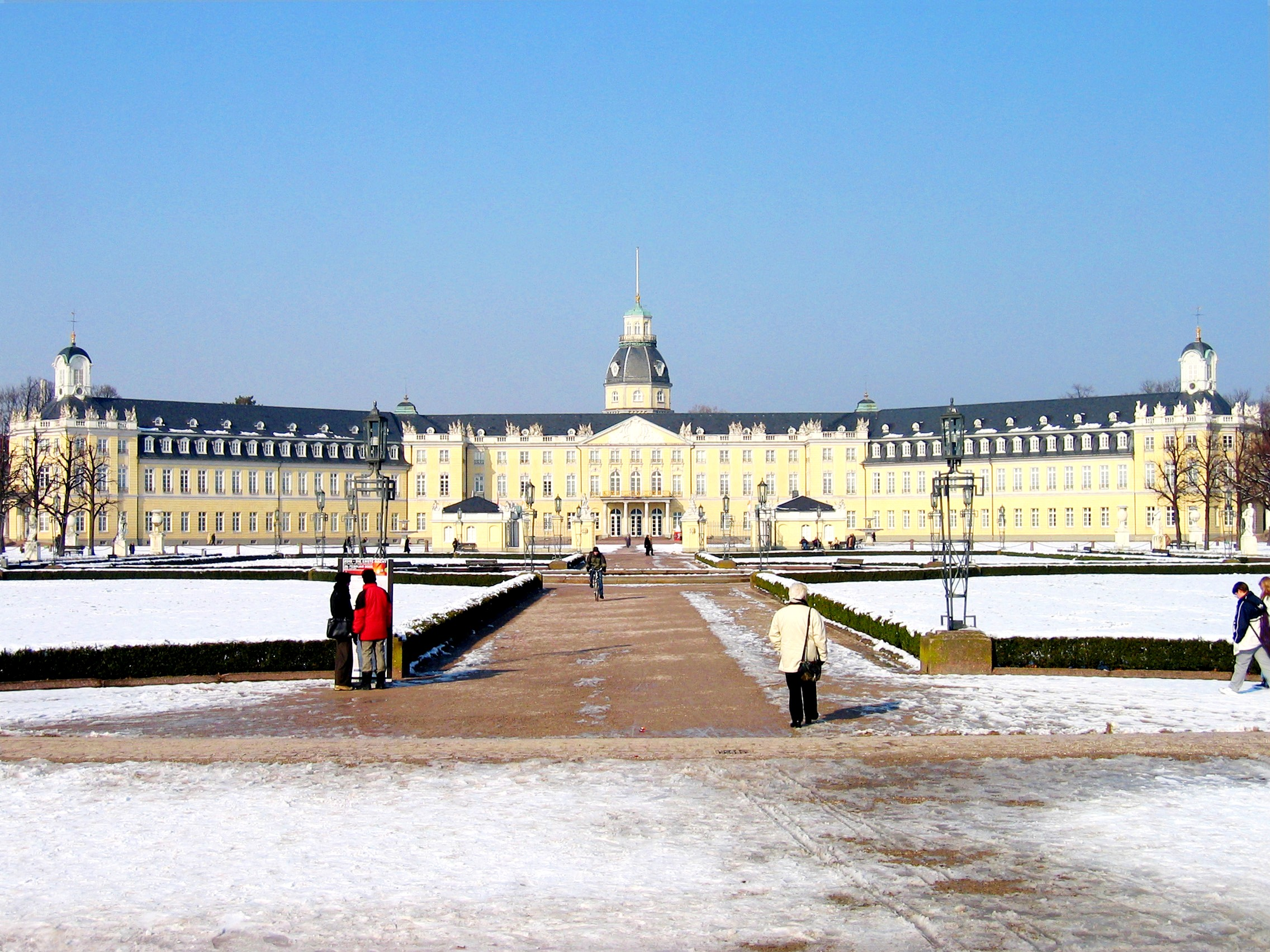
Front view (February 2005)

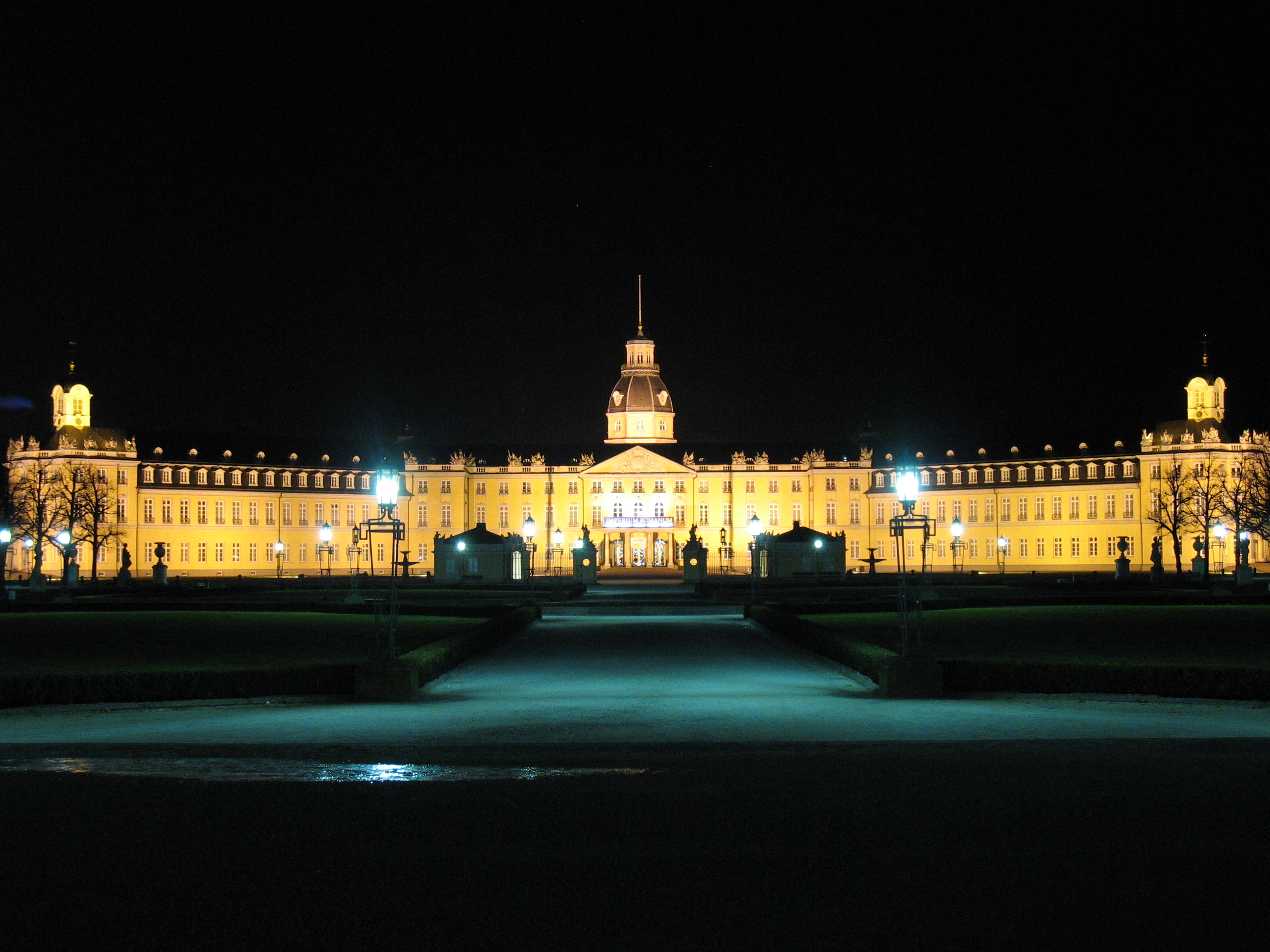
The palace at night

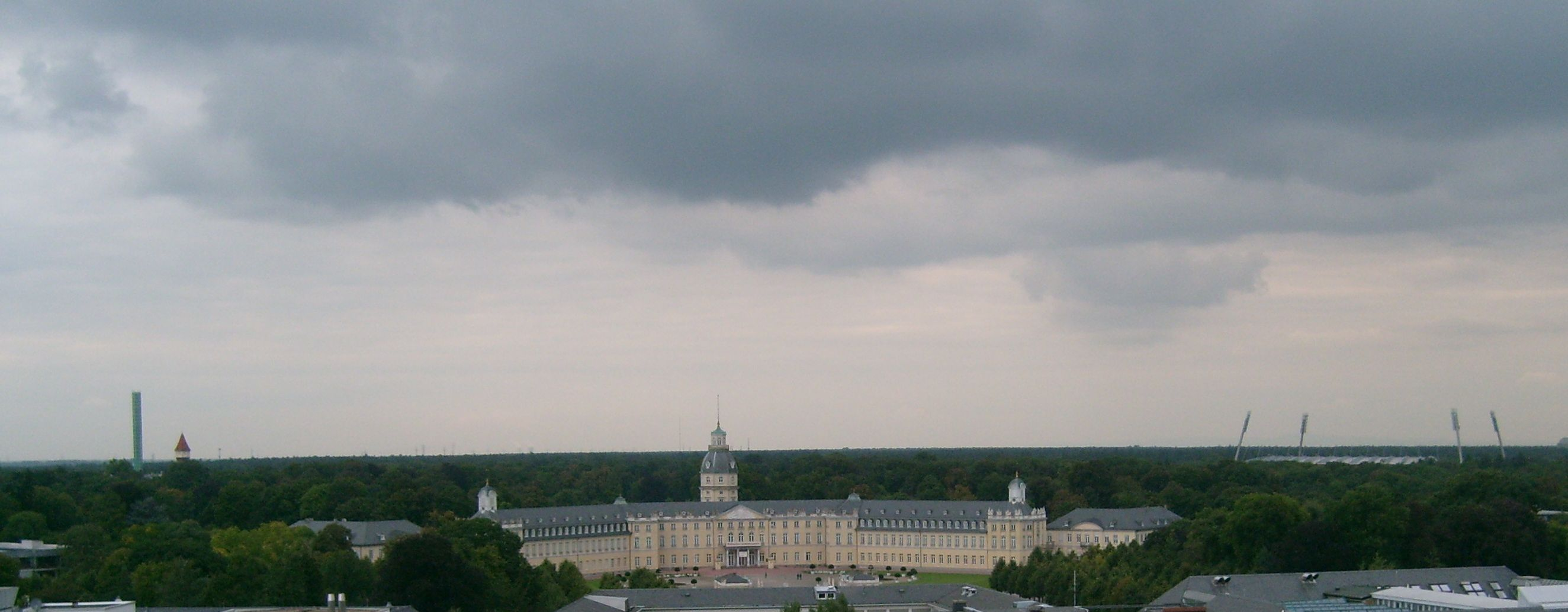
View from the townhall tower

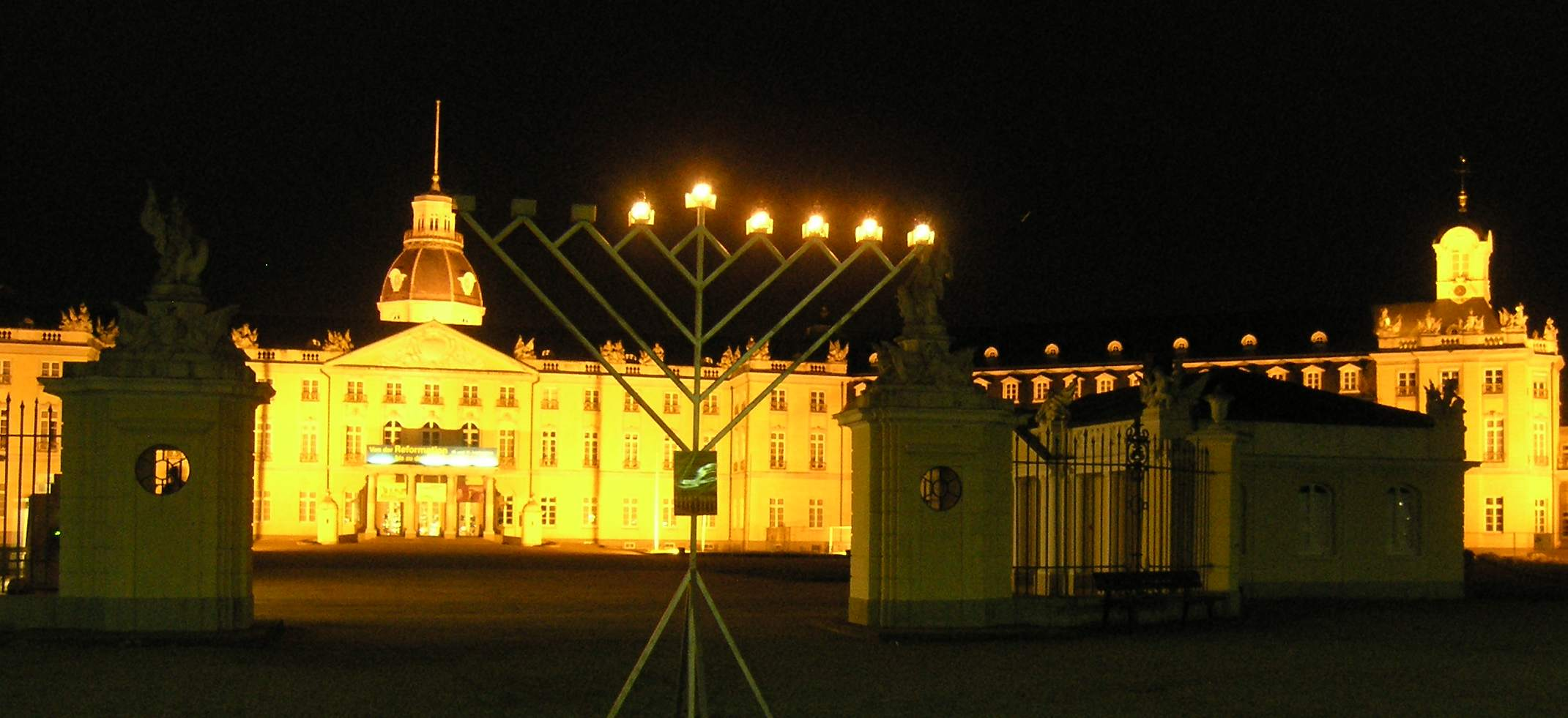
The palace at night with Menorah (Hanukkah)

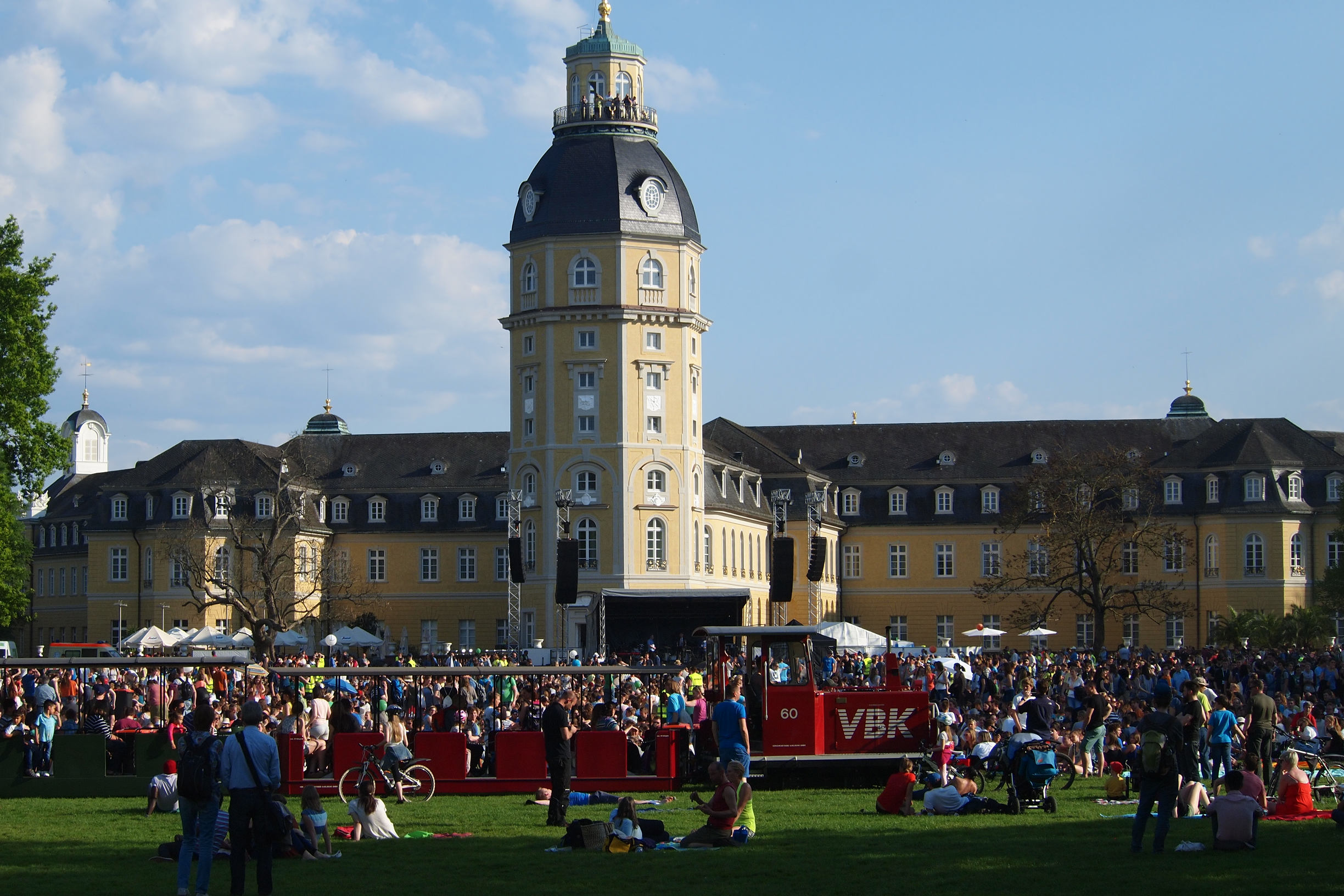
The palace during a youth convention

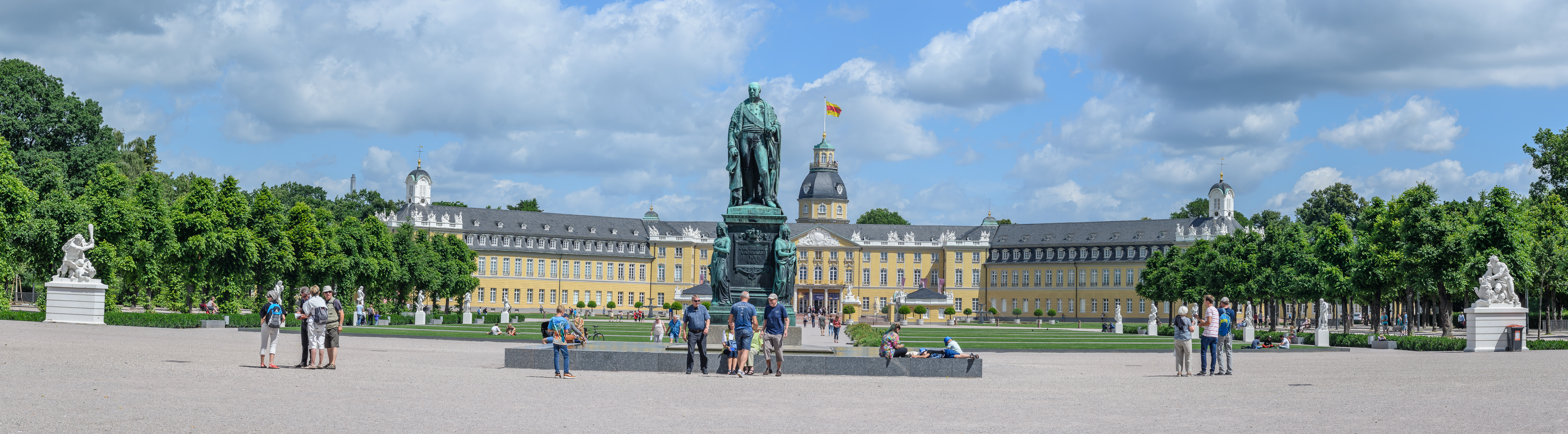
The palace during the summer

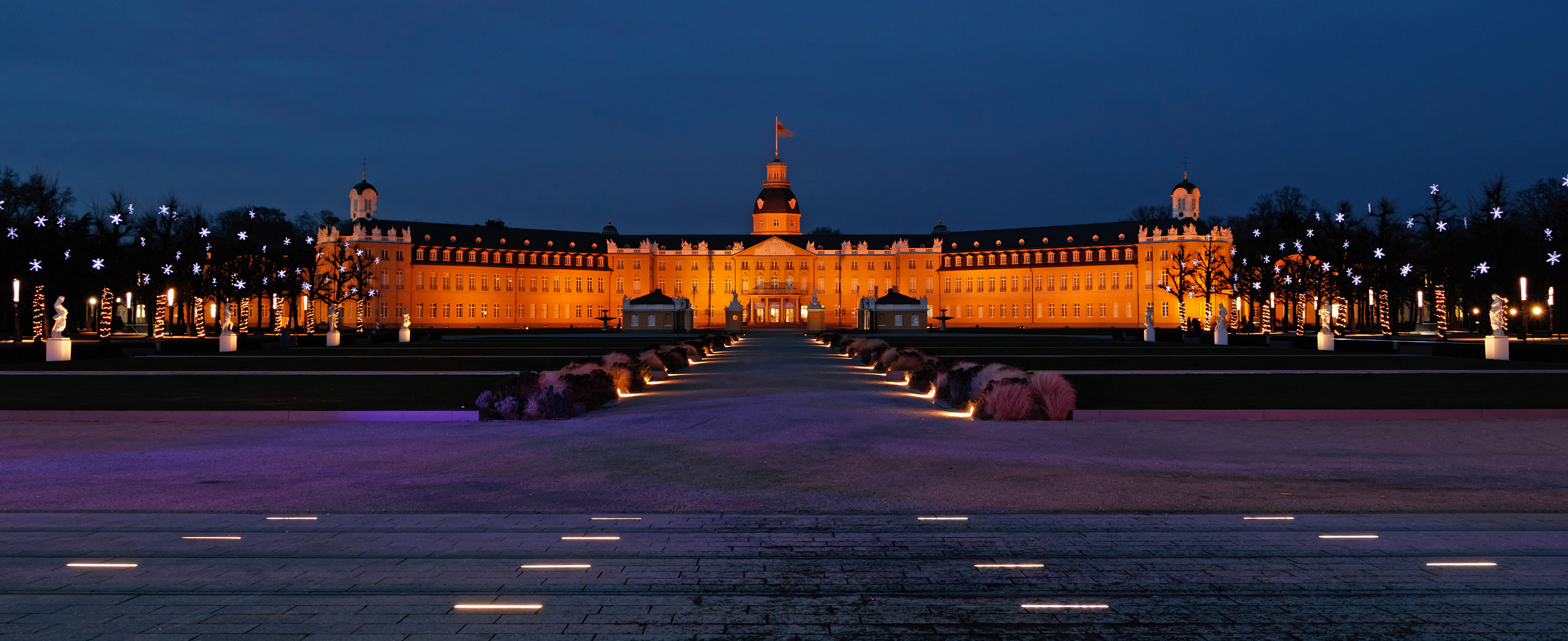
The palace with Christmas illumination

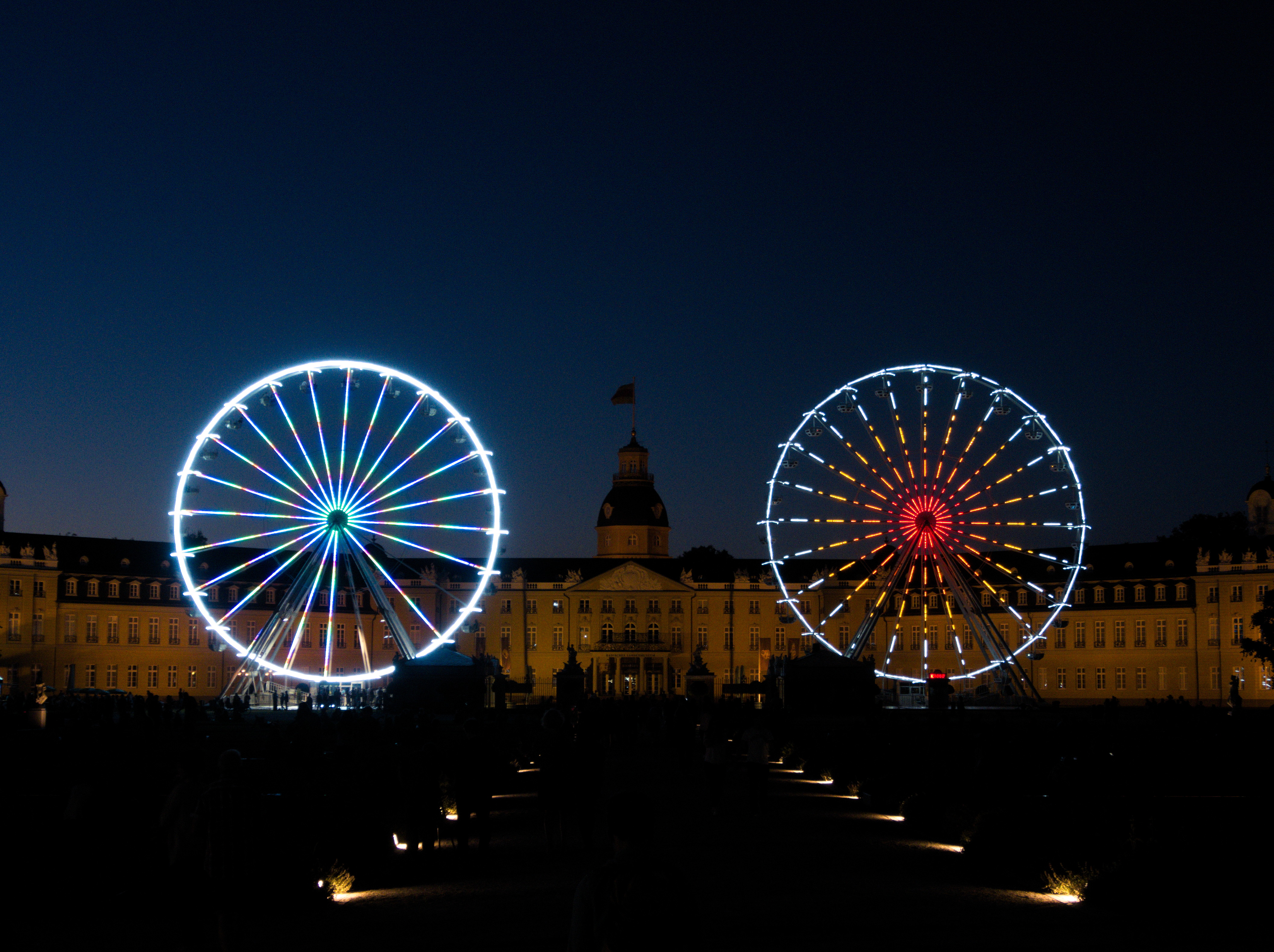
Two wheels in front of the palace during Heimattage celebrations in 2017

== See also ==
- List of Baroque residences
