= Baumgarten-Bau =

Headquarters of the Federal Constitutional Court in Karlsruhe, Baden-Württemberg

Coordinates: 49°0′46″N 8°24′5.3″E

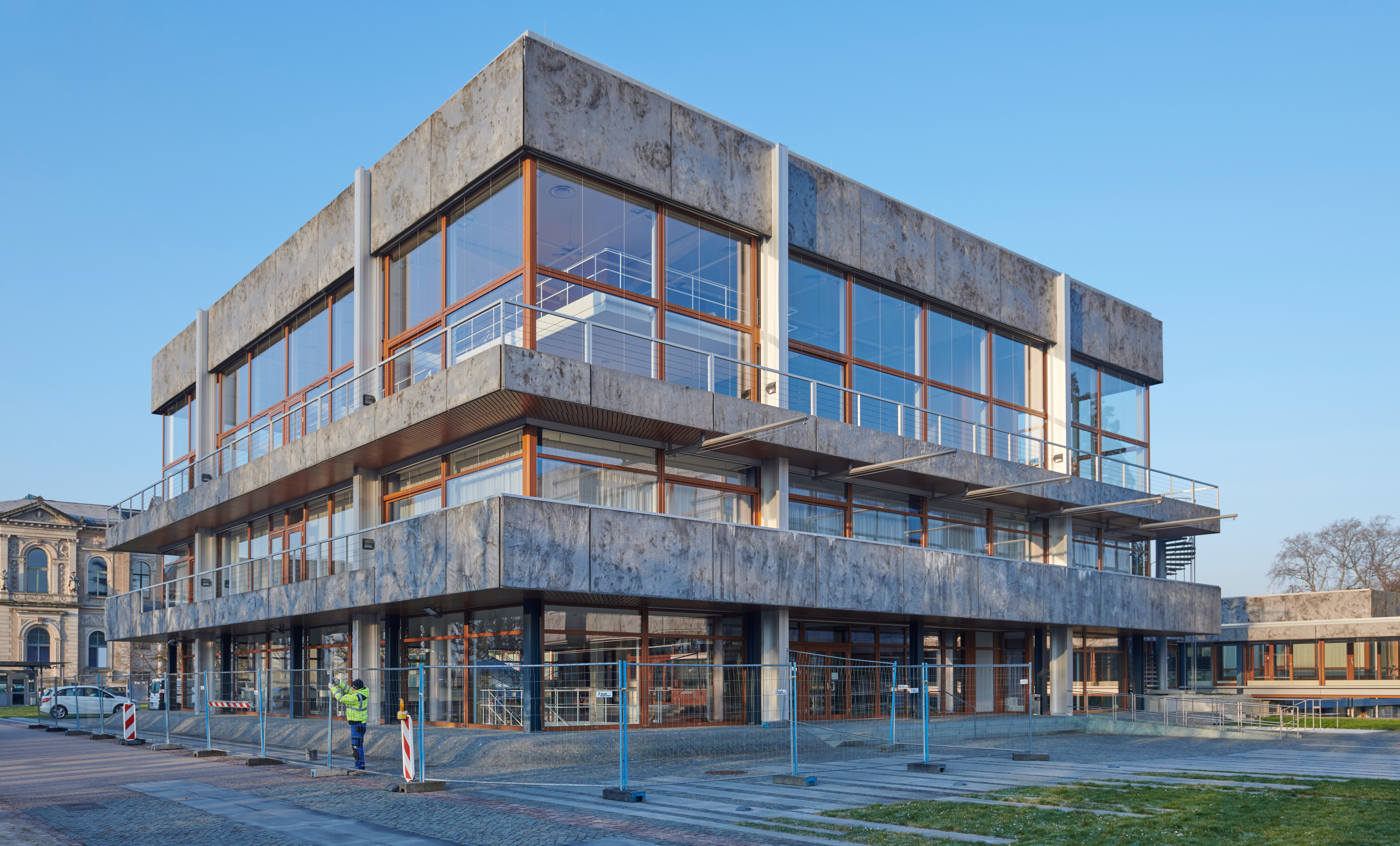
Meeting room building of the Federal Constitutional Court (component III)

The Baumgarten-Bau (lit. 'Baumgarten Building') in Karlsruhe serves as the official seat of the Federal Constitutional Court. Built from 1965 to 1969 in the Botanical Garden of Schlossgarten, this building complex was originally composed of five pavilion-like structures with flat roofs, arranged around a long connecting corridor. Architect Paul Baumgarten created the original plans. The total floor area of the Baumgarten-Bau is approximately 16,000 square meters. The individual components of the building differ in height and have only a few stories. The glass and steel facade of the building gives it a plain and sober aesthetic and is attributed to the Modernist style.

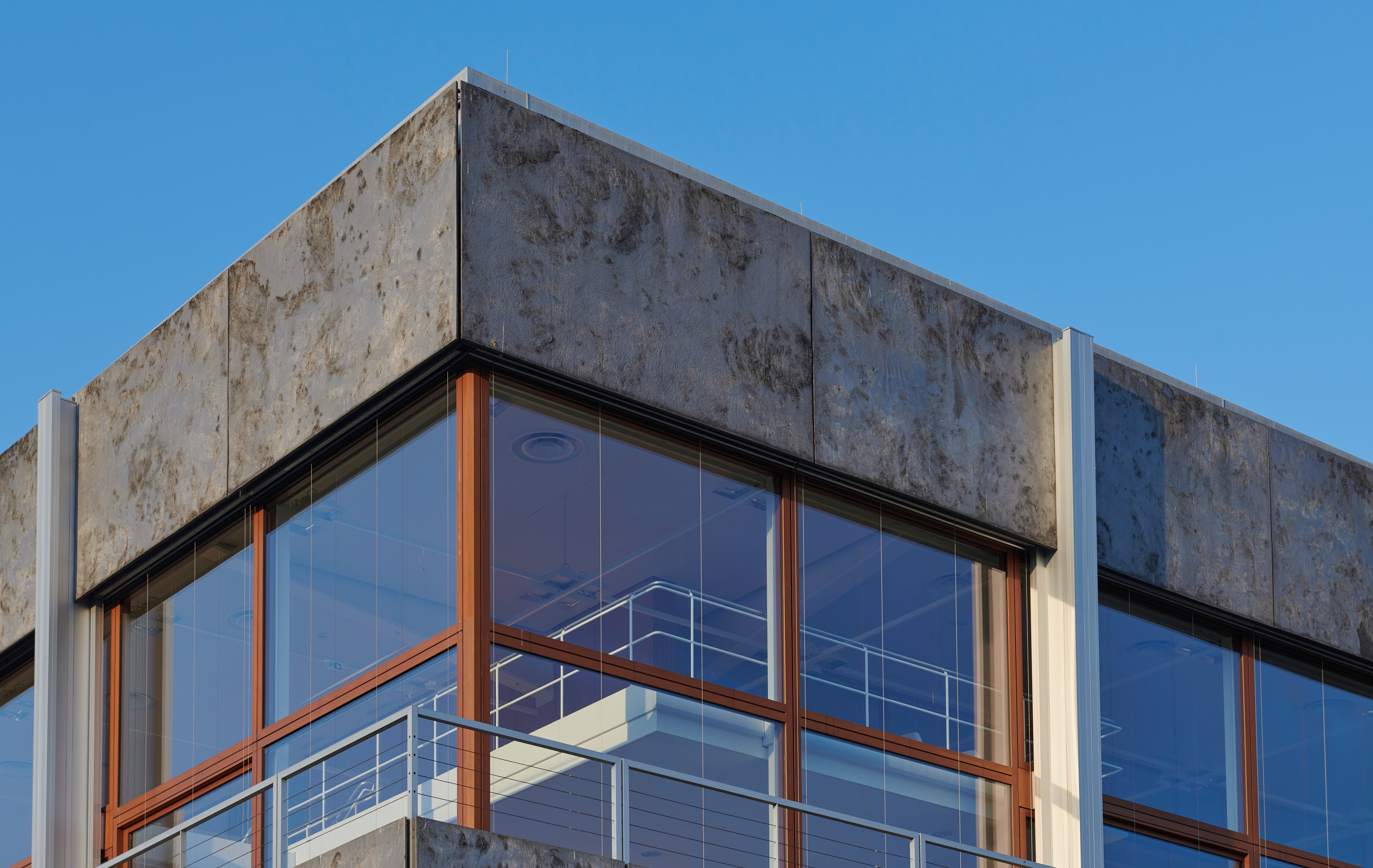
Facade detail (component III)

The Baumgarten-Bau became the official residence of the court in May 1969, replacing the Prinz-Max-Palais, which served as the official residence between 1951 and 1969 until it became inadequate for the growing need for space. The ensemble of buildings is designated as a cultural monument of special significance. From 2005 to 2007, an extension was added to the complex in the southwest, expanding it from five to six buildings. During extensive renovation work from 2011 to 2014, the Federal Constitutional Court temporarily relocated its official seat to the Oststadt district of Karlsruhe. In 2021, around 260 people were working in this building.

== History ==
=== Predecessor building ===
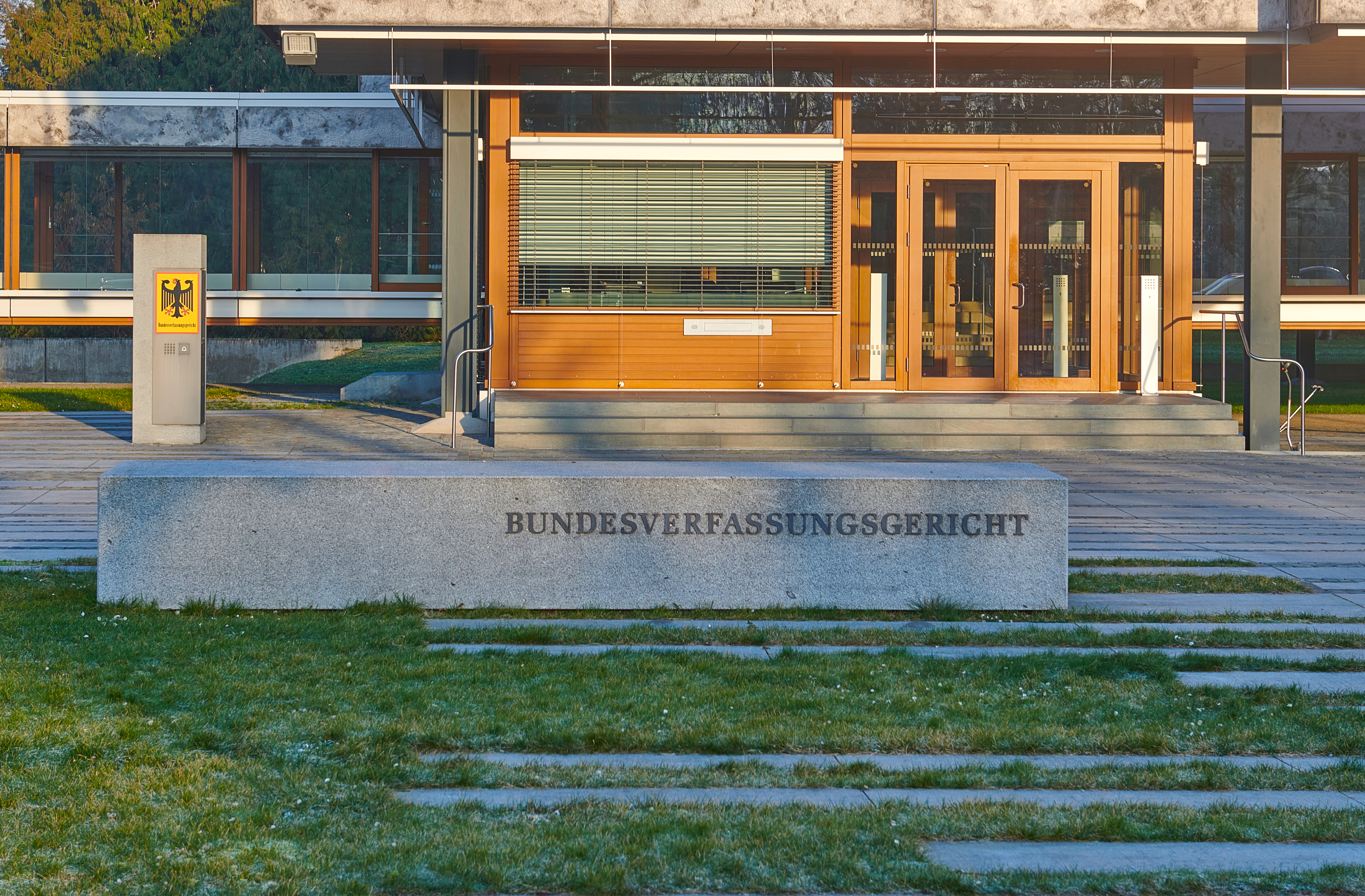
Entrance area of the judge building (component IV)

The Federal Constitutional Court initially had its first official residence in the Prinz-Max-Palais from 1951 to 1969. This city villa, dating back to the 1880s and designed by architect Josef Durm in the Wilhelminian style, is located in Karlsruhe's inner-city west near Europaplatz, about half a kilometer southwest of the current seat of the Federal Constitutional Court. The decision to establish the seat of the Federal Constitutional Court in Karlsruhe was made in December 1950, despite strong protests from Berlin. The Prinz-Max-Palais, which had been damaged during World War II, was subsequently rebuilt and adapted to meet the court's requirements. On September 28, 1951, a ceremony attended by the President of Germany Theodor Heuss and Federal Chancellor Konrad Adenauer marked the official move of the Federal Constitutional Court to the new premises. However, it became apparent that the Palais was insufficient in terms of space; the justices often had to share rooms with colleagues and staff, and for larger sessions, the court had to relocate to other halls in the city. As early as 1959, Gebhard Müller, who was the President of the Federal Constitutional Court at the time, expressed the need for a new building. There were considerations to move the Constitutional Court's seat to Munich or to relocate it to the nearby castle. The city of Karlsruhe wanted to prevent both and launched an architectural design competition in 1960.

=== Location search ===
The Court Theatre, which had been destroyed during World War II, was selected as the location for the new Federal Constitutional Court building. This theater had been originally designed by architect Heinrich Hübsch. In September, architect Paul Baumgarten presented three out of the five initial design proposals for the building complex, which would consist of pavilion-like structures. The design was characterized by its sober and objective style, deliberately departing from the architectural traditions of court buildings from the 19th and 20th centuries. This approach aimed to ensure that the building complex would not disrupt the overall urban concept of Schlossplatz. To achieve this, the complex was built on the same level as the surrounding area instead of rising in height. Paul Baumgarten took inspiration from the German contribution to the 1958 Brussels World's Fair, designed by architects Egon Eiermann and Sep Ruf. Their transparent glass and steel architecture served as a structural model for Baumgarten's design.

During this period, there were considerations within the population and the administration to rebuild the Court Theatre. Paul Baumgarten also considered a possible new building as an architect and won the architectural competition for it. With the decision in favor of the new Federal Constitutional Court building, the plans to reconstruct the Court Theatre were ultimately abandoned. The demolition of the wartime ruins of the Court Theatre, although controversial, took place in 1964/1965.

=== Construction and use ===
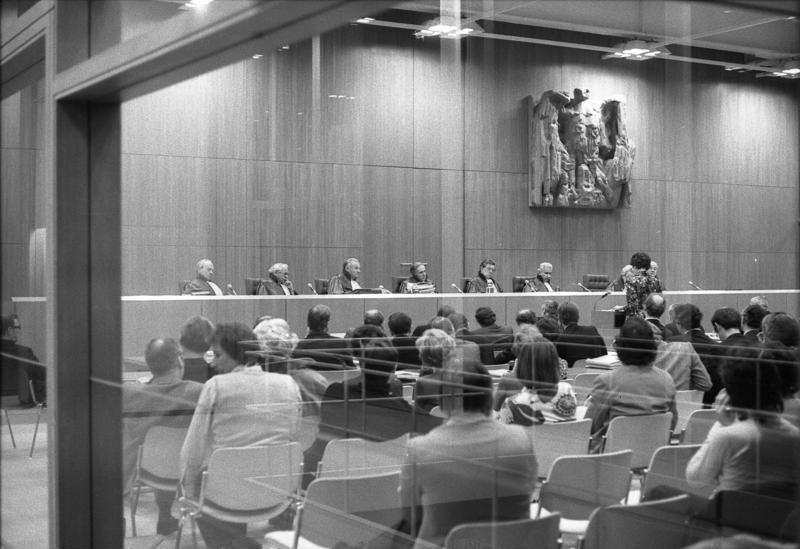
Oral proceedings in the courtroom (November 1974)

In February 1965, construction work began on the ensemble of buildings in Karlsruhe's palace district. The topping-out ceremony took place in October 1966, and the official residence was handed over on May 6, 1969. The project cost almost DM 20,000,000, which, adjusted for purchasing power, equals approximately €41,600,000 in 2023.

The construction period of the Baumgarten-bau coincided with the hosting of the 1967 Federal Garden Show (Bundesgartenschau) in Karlsruhe. Landscape architect Walter Rossow developed a green path for pedestrians from Karlsruhe's main railway station through the listed Stadtgarten to the Schlosspark. The green and open spaces around the Baumgarten building were designed to align with this concept and connect to the adjacent Schlosspark.

On the evening of March 4, 1975, there was an attack on the Federal Constitutional Court. An explosive charge was attached to a pillar of the justices' building, causing significant damage to a large window pane. However, nobody was injured. The investigation revealed that the explosive charge, due to its casing, could not have caused extensive destruction and had not been professionally made. Later, a radical feminist terrorist organization called the Red Zora claimed responsibility for the attack in a letter to the news magazine Der Spiegel. They had attacked to protest the Federal Constitutional Court's ruling, which had declared the reform of Section 218 Strafgesetzbuch null and void just a week earlier. Despite the letters of confession, the perpetrators were never apprehended.

Starting in 1982, the Federal Constitutional Court rented additional premises in the northwest wing of Karlsruhe Palace due to the growing need for space. An underground passageway connects the Baumgarten complex to these rooms. The former dining casino was converted into additional office space between 1995 and 1997. In 2000, seven more offices were added to the library's basement. In 2001, 13 additional rooms were allocated to the justices' building in the basement.

=== Supplementary building ===
In a competition in 2002, the architect Michael Schrölkamp was finally chosen to design the extension. Over two hundred architects took part in the competition. The challenge for the design was to avoid causing any harm to the existing building complex or the Botanical Garden. During the competition phase, a citizens' initiative voiced concerns about the winning design, as it did not adequately consider the protection of the Botanic Garden. Eventually, this initial design was abandoned. After a revision, Schrölkamp's design was considered the only practical option. Other designs that were acceptable to the citizens' initiative proposed a larger and almost twice as expensive new building. In response, the heirs of the Baumgarten family threatened a copyright dispute, leading to the implementation of Schrölkamp's design.

Between June 2005 and March 2007, the new building was built with a usable area of 794 square meters, a gross floor area of 1,576 square meters, and a gross volume of 5,081 cubic meters. The construction costs amounted to €3,400,000. The in-court opening ceremony took place on May 10, 2007, in the presence of the then Prime Minister Günther Oettinger, State Secretary Engelbert Lütke Daldrup, the then Mayor of Karlsruhe Heinz Fenrich, the architect, and other guests of honor. The extension building was occupied in 2007.

=== Interim quarter 2011 to 2014 ===
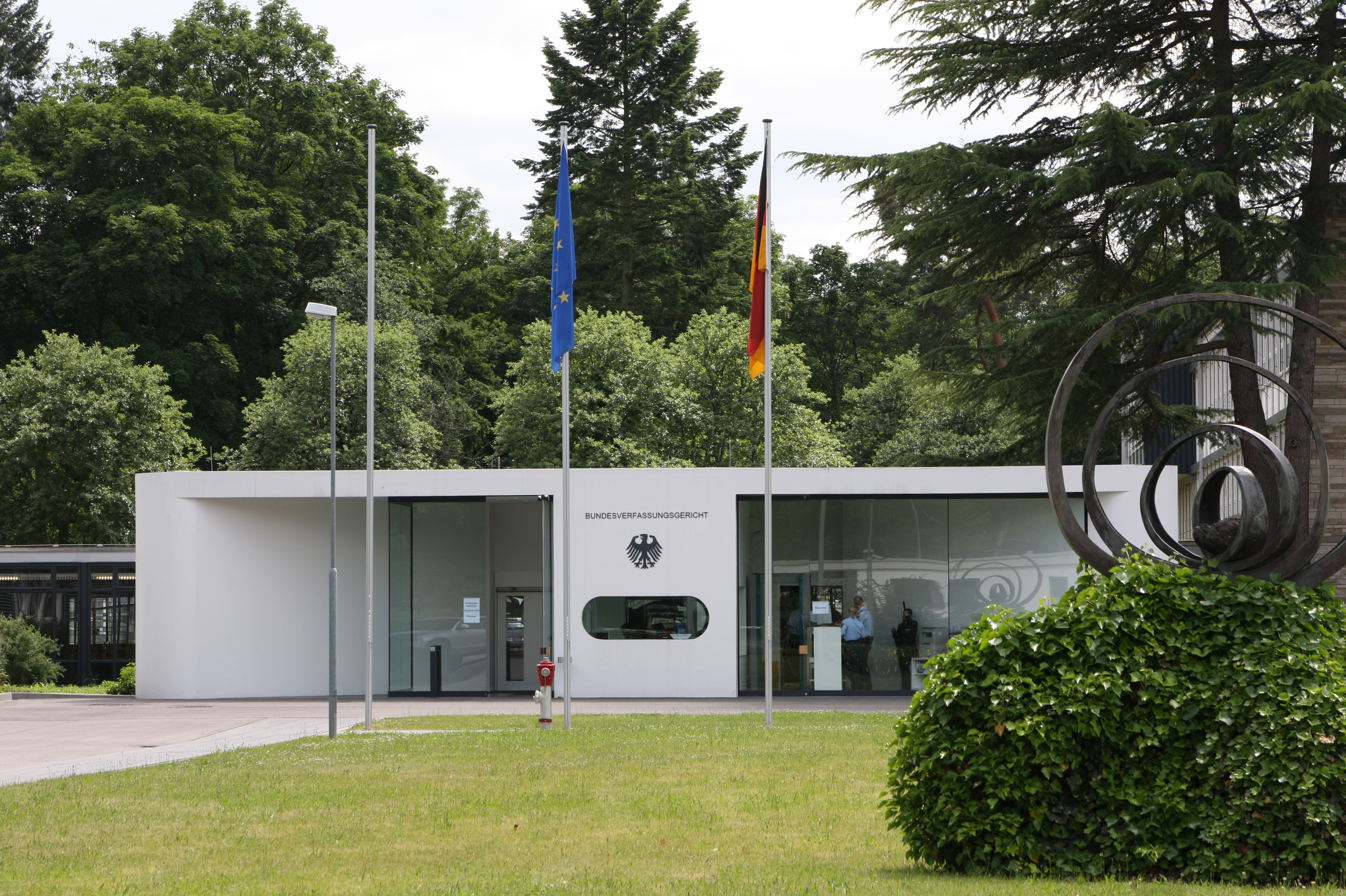
Entrance area of the Waldstadt headquarters (2012)

Since German reunification, the Federal Constitutional Court has received significantly more complaint cases, which means that the original form of the Baumgarten-Bau no longer meets the increased requirements. Along with a planned extension towards the Botanical Garden, renovation work on the existing buildings became necessary in 2011. To manage the extensive construction, which spanned several years, the 16 justices and approximately 60 staff members at the time relocated to interim quarters for three years. The interim quarters, situated to the northeast of the Baumgarten structure, consisted of the previous General Kammhuber barracks located at Rintheimer Querallee 11 on the eastern boundary of the Hardtwald forest. The architects from Stuttgart's Lederer Ragnarsdóttir Oei firm were tasked with designing a standard office and semi-public space in a representative style. Similar to the Federal Constitutional Court's main headquarters at the Schlossbezirk, the interim office – also known as Dienstsitz Waldstadt (Waldstadt office) after the neighboring Waldstadt district of Karlsruhe – consists of various interconnected structures with corridors and connecting wings. The architects designed the building to have a resemblance to the main official seat. Right after entering the office, a light green carpet stands out against a glass picture. The plenary hall, formerly a training hall of the barracks, now has a lateral stair tower attached to it, leading to the press gallery. This addition gives the hall a sculptural appearance from the outside. Inside, there are two glass porches on each long side that open onto the courtyards. The roof overhangs created by these porches are reminiscent of the architectural style of the 1950s. The interim building took up certain forms of the Baumgarten building and used them as a model. The design aims to appear neither ostentatious nor too spartan. The return from the Waldstadt headquarters to the Baumgarten Building took place from September 26 to 28, 2014.

The barracks buildings converted into a court have been used on an interim basis by the Federal Court of Justice since 2020, as one of the office buildings at its headquarters in Herrenstraße, known as the West Building, is undergoing renovation. Additionally, the Karlsruhe Federal Police Inspectorate is housed in four other side barracks buildings.

=== Renovation 2011 to 2014 ===
Many years of operation, comfort deficiencies, and an analysis of the building fabric showed that a structural and energetic refurbishment of the Baumgarten-bau had become necessary. For this reason, the buildings underwent a three-year refurbishment from August 2011 to August 2014, at a total cost of around €55,000,000. In addition to retrofitting and optimizing the basic fabric, the challenge was to preserve the listed ensemble.

The distinctive façades with wooden windows made of Red Oregon Pine and single glazing could not be kept. They were replaced with double-glazed windows and had no reflective coating to preserve transparency. Concrete parapets were given more energy-efficient fully insulated sandwich panels, and the elaborate cast aluminum panels were removed, cleaned, and re-installed with reinforced fixings. Inside, pollutant remediation was necessary in some areas. Areas whose functional use had been eliminated were redesigned accordingly. To ensure fire protection, steel supports were ground down and recoated. In addition, the entire technical building equipment was brought up to date, new building and communication technology was installed and efficient LED lighting was installed. The work was carried out by the Rotterdam architectural firm West 8, which won an international competition in 2012. The installation of cooling ceilings or so-called Coolwave elements in all offices contributed to improving comfort, as did the installation of carpeting and sound-absorbing elements to improve acoustics and the installation of perforated sunshade elements. Interior finishing measures included the renewal of sanitary facilities and the replacement of radiators, floor coverings, and furniture.

=== Open Day ===
To celebrate the 70th anniversary of the Basic Law, the Federal Constitutional Court opened its doors on May 25, 2019, and hosted an open day for 5,000 interested citizens. During this event, visitors had the opportunity to take a free tour lasting about 90 minutes, which included viewing the courtroom and the justices' ring. Additionally, outside of this event, there are still chances for restricted public tours.

== Description ==
=== Location and surroundings ===
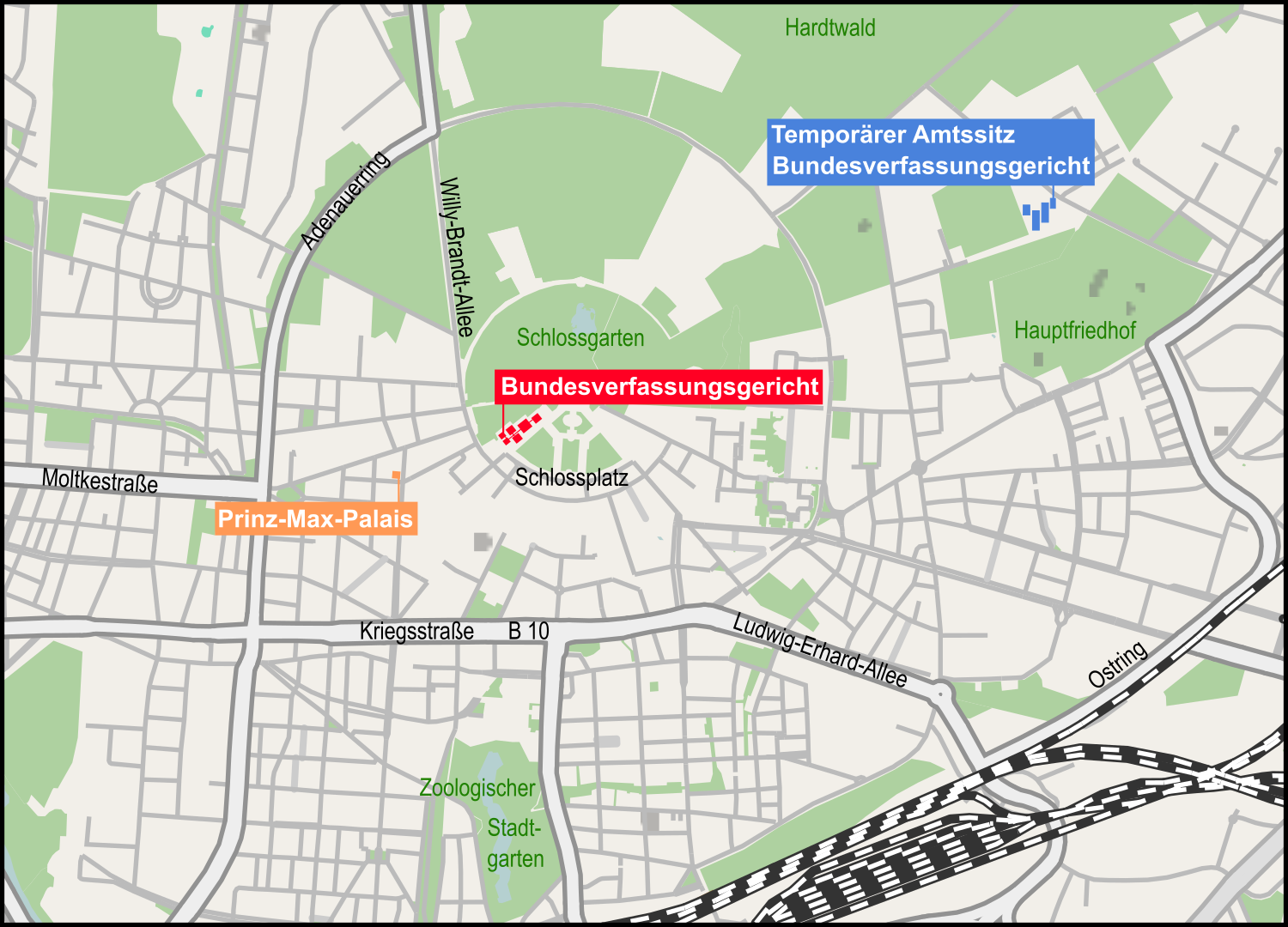
Locations of the Federal Constitutional Court Karlsruhe Prinz-Max-Palais (1951–1969) Baumgarten-Bau (since 1969) Interim quarters (2011–2014)

The Baumgarten-bau complex is situated in the Karlsruhe district of Innenstadt-West, with its address at Schlossbezirk 3. It is located on the southern edge of the Schlossgarten, adjacent to and surrounded by Karlsruhe Palace to the north, the Schlossplatz to the east, the Staatliche Kunsthalle to the south, and the Botanical Garden to the west. Directly opposite the Waldstrasse entrance is the Karlsruhe District Court.

The Federal Constitutional Court is accessible by motorized vehicles only from the south via Waldstrasse or from the east via Schlossplatz. However, only authorized personnel and invited individuals are allowed to enter the Schlossbezirk through the gates. The forecourt, known as the Platz der Grundrechte (Square of Fundamental Rights), is accessible via the Schlossbezirk entrance. This square was designed in 2005 and features 24 double-sided street signs with quotes from judges, jurists, and citizens related to the topic of rights and wrongs. Another entrance to the property leads to an underground parking garage beneath the courtroom building. The Federal Police are responsible for safeguarding the buildings and grounds and maintaining a presence on-site. Protective measures are enforced through access controls and the patrol presence of the Federal Police. Only authorized individuals are permitted to enter paths directly adjacent to the partially enclosed building complex, and it is prohibited to access the lawns around the complex.

The north-western side of the building complex is almost entirely covered by trees, while the southeastern side is characterized by the forecourt and the paved driveway, which is densely planted with trees. This avenue serves as the immediate visual axis leading to the west wing of Karlsruhe Palace, aligning with the overall geometric layout of the entire complex. The structures of the Baumgarten-Bau are precisely parallel to this visual axis and seamlessly integrate into the visually distinct, older environment due to their simple architectural style.

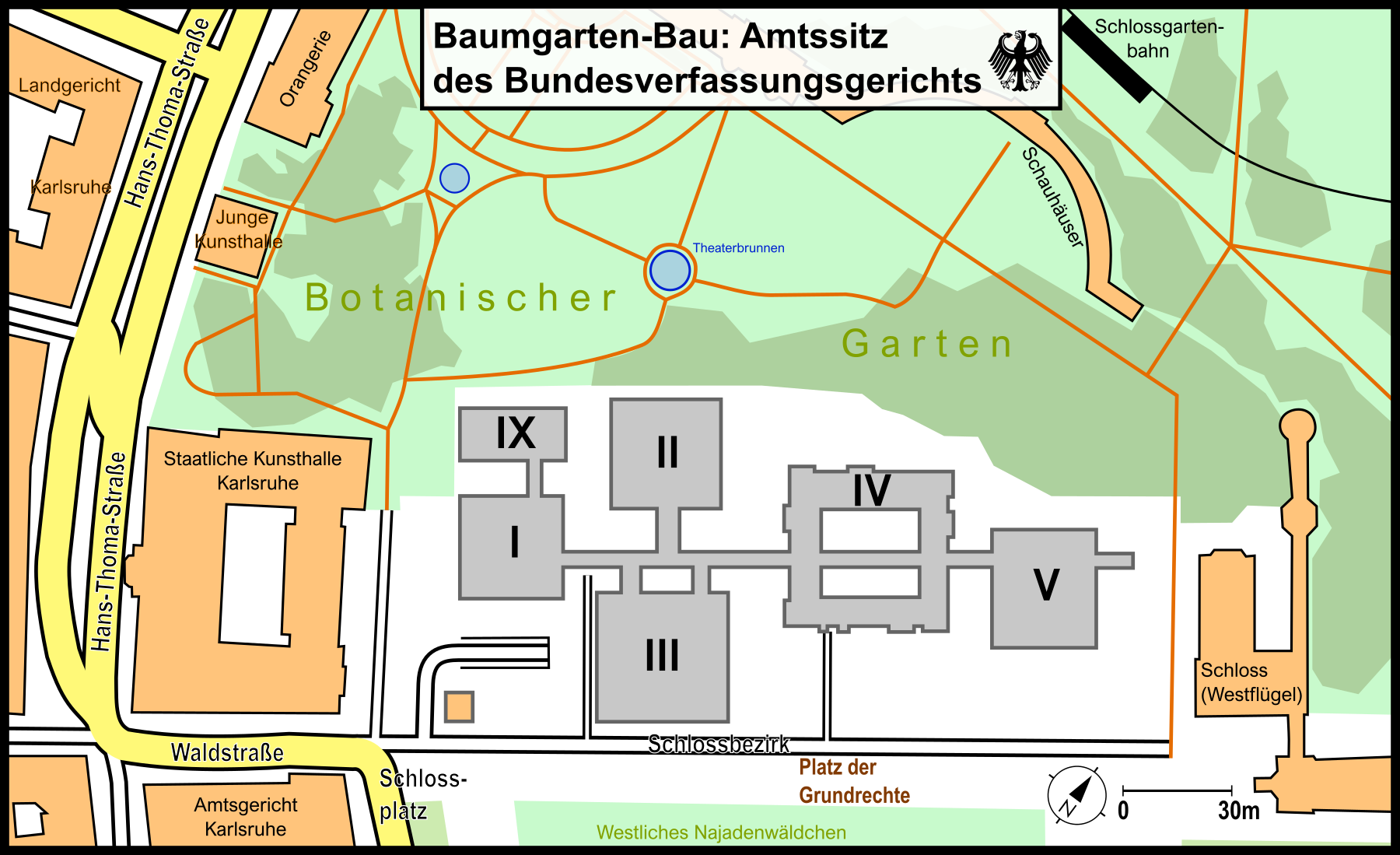
Site plan and surroundings of the Baumgarten building

=== Building complex and outdoor facilities ===
The Baumgarten-Bau complex, comprising six buildings with predominantly rectangular or square floor plans, encompasses a usable floor space of 10,086 square meters, a gross floor space of 16,342 square meters, and a gross volume of 64,274 cubic meters. The complex consists of the following components, each officially designated with Roman numerals:

- Component I: former casino
- Component II: Library
- Component III: Meeting hall building
- Component IV: justices' building, also: "justices' ring"
- Component V: Administration building
- Component IX: Extension building with additional offices

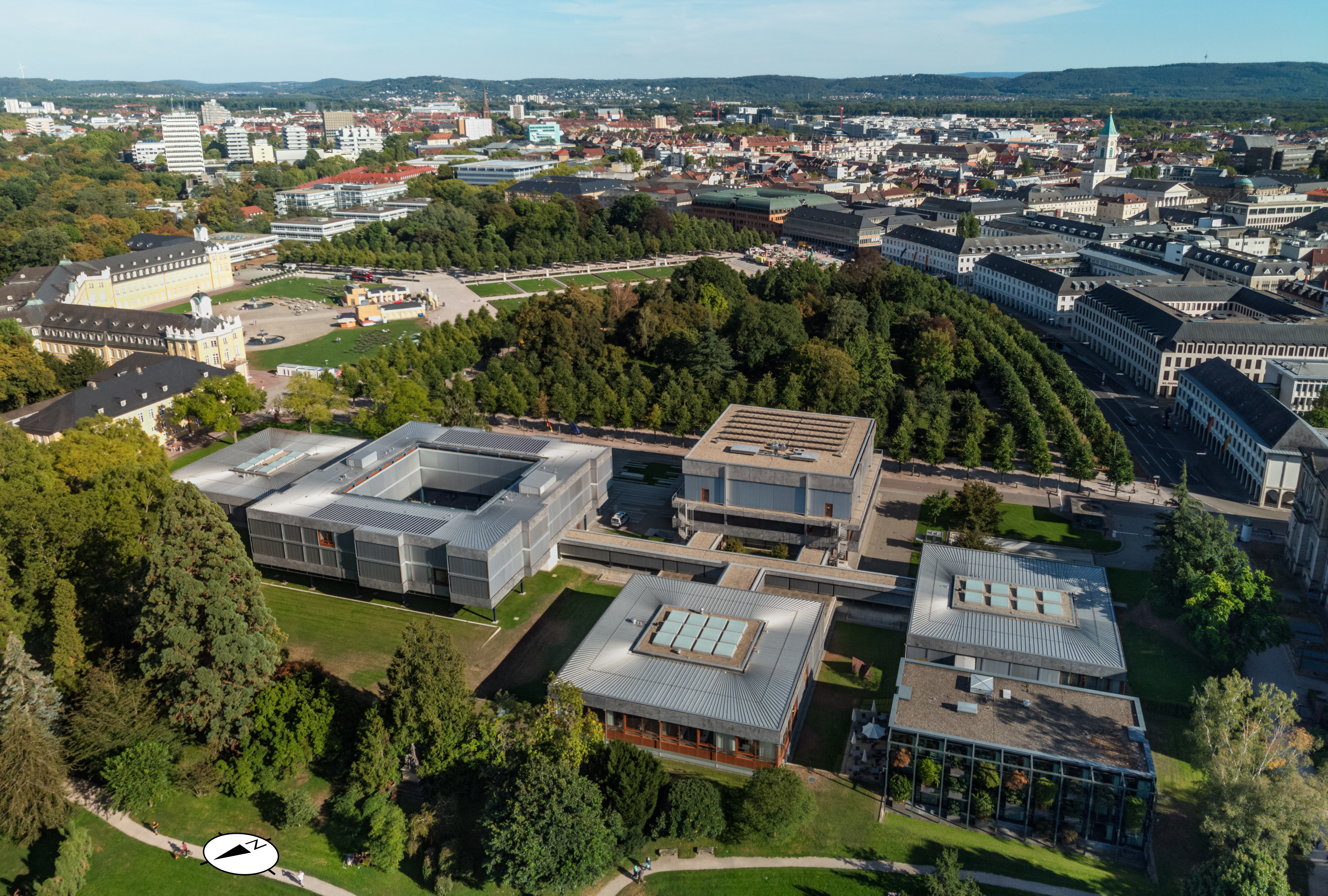
Aerial photo of the Baumgarten building (seat of the Federal Constitutional Court) in Karlsruhe

The buildings within the complex are distinctly separated in terms of their designated functions and are arranged with varying heights, which serve to symbolize their significance and their relationship to the public. In addition to the workplaces for the judges, the building complex also houses the judicial administration, the general administration, the EDP/documentation department, the protocol department, and the library. The building complex is also the home of the judiciary.

The various buildings are interconnected by a glazed connecting building that spans a length of approximately 150 meters. This straight passage extends from the southern former casino through the justices' building to the northern administration building. About midway along this corridor, two perpendicular branches lead to the courtroom building in the south and the library in the north. The extension building, occupied in 2007, is accessible from the administration building via a covered connecting corridor. The basements of all buildings are built with reinforced concrete and external foam glass thermal insulation. Above the entrance level, the stories are designed with a steel skeleton structure and reinforced concrete ceilings.

A feature of the Baumgarten-bau is the full-surface embedding of the complex in the surrounding lawn. This is intended to create a unity between architecture and nature. The merging of these two elements is particularly striking at the entrance to the conference hall and the justices' building. The partially paved forecourt is interrupted by striped lawns. The rhythmic striped joint grid of the natural stone slabs derives visually from the supporting structure of the building. The Dutch landscape architecture firm West 8 was responsible for the design of the outdoor facilities. The transition from green space to building is achieved in the inner courtyards of the complex with sculptural trees and colorful flower carpets.

=== Components ===
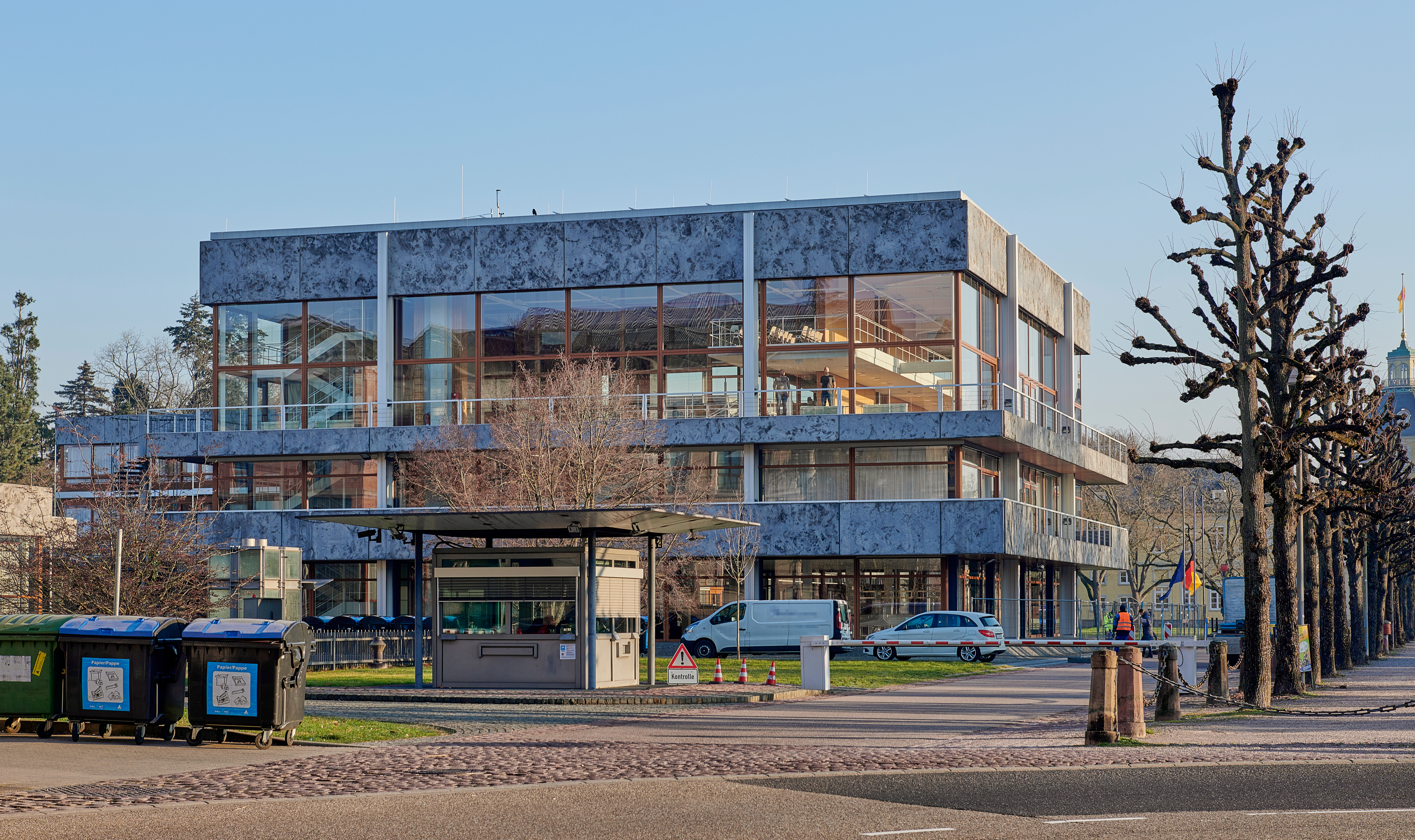
Federal Constitutional Court Karlsruhe: Component III

The tallest structure in the complex, standing at approximately 15 meters, is the meeting hall building (Component III). This building features a glass façade that allows a direct view into the meeting hall, making it the part of the complex most visible to the public. The first floor of this building includes a spacious foyer and a plenary hall. On the mezzanine floor, one will find a reception hall and a press room. The plenary hall on the second floor contains a small gallery with seating for 44 people, while across from it is the justices' table adorned with a heavy wooden Federal Eagle relief sculpted by Hans Kindermann. The courtroom has glass walls on the sides, providing an unobstructed view of the palace and the palace square. On the side facing the Botanical Garden are consultation rooms and adjoining rooms.

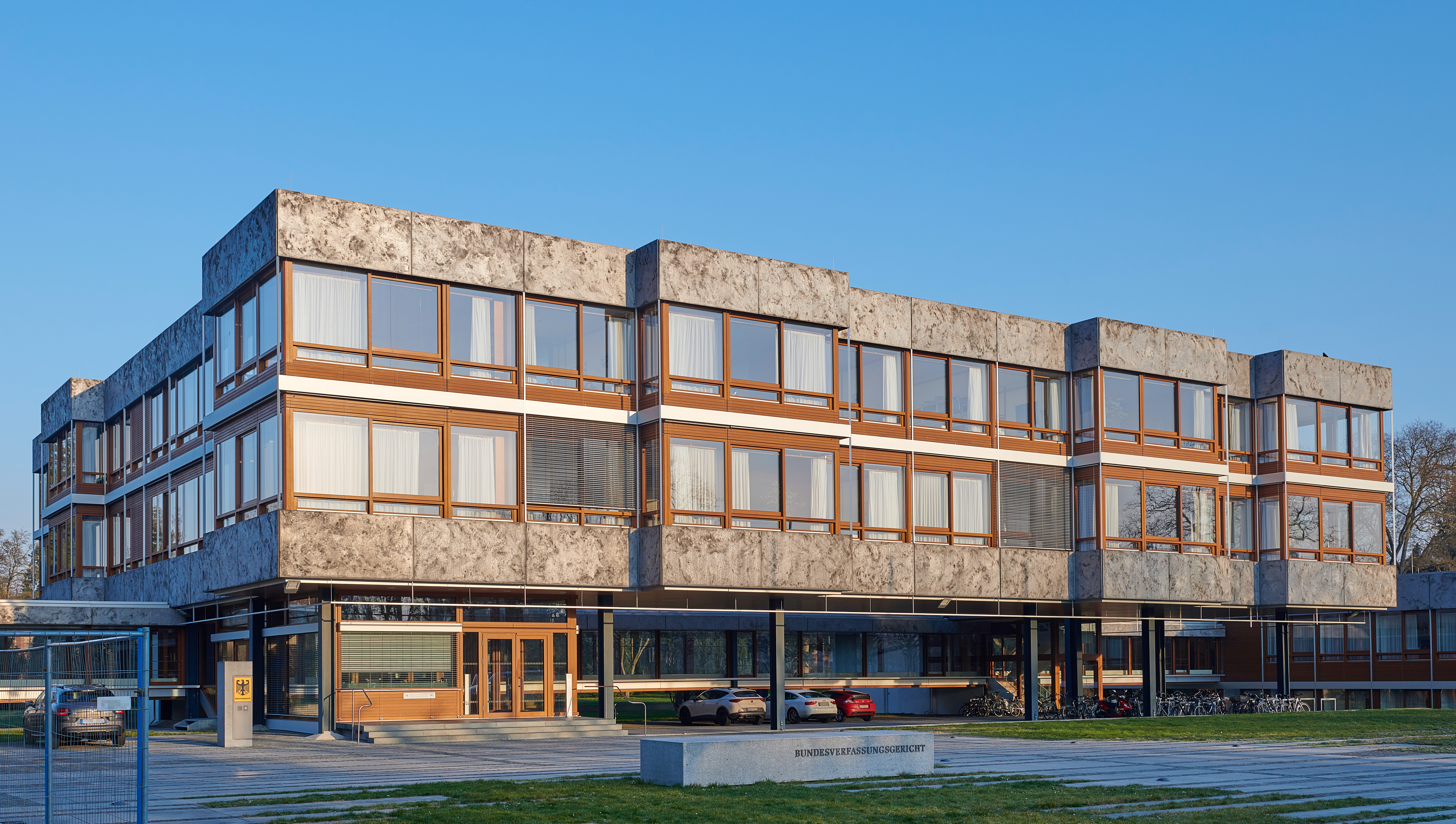
Federal Constitutional Court Karlsruhe: Section IV

The justices' building, which is adjacent to the palace (Component IV) or justices' ring, is a rectangular atrium building with an inner courtyard at its center. It houses the two senates of the Federal Constitutional Court, with each senate having its floor for its eight justices and support staff. The rooms are arranged in a ring-like formation, organized according to the justices, academic staff, and the secretariat. The Senate's rooms and the offices of the president and vice-president face the Botanical Garden. The building is elevated on stilts, creating the appearance of it floating above the ground, and providing parking spaces underneath. The ceilings in the justices' building are supported by four trussed girders spanning two stories, located in front of the façade. This unique design choice means that the justices' building is the only one among the structural elements that do not form an exact rectangle in its plan. The diagonal bars are reinforced with prestressing steels graded according to their corresponding bar forces. On average, there are 26 prestressing steels used. The construction was heavily influenced by considerations of earthquake resistance.

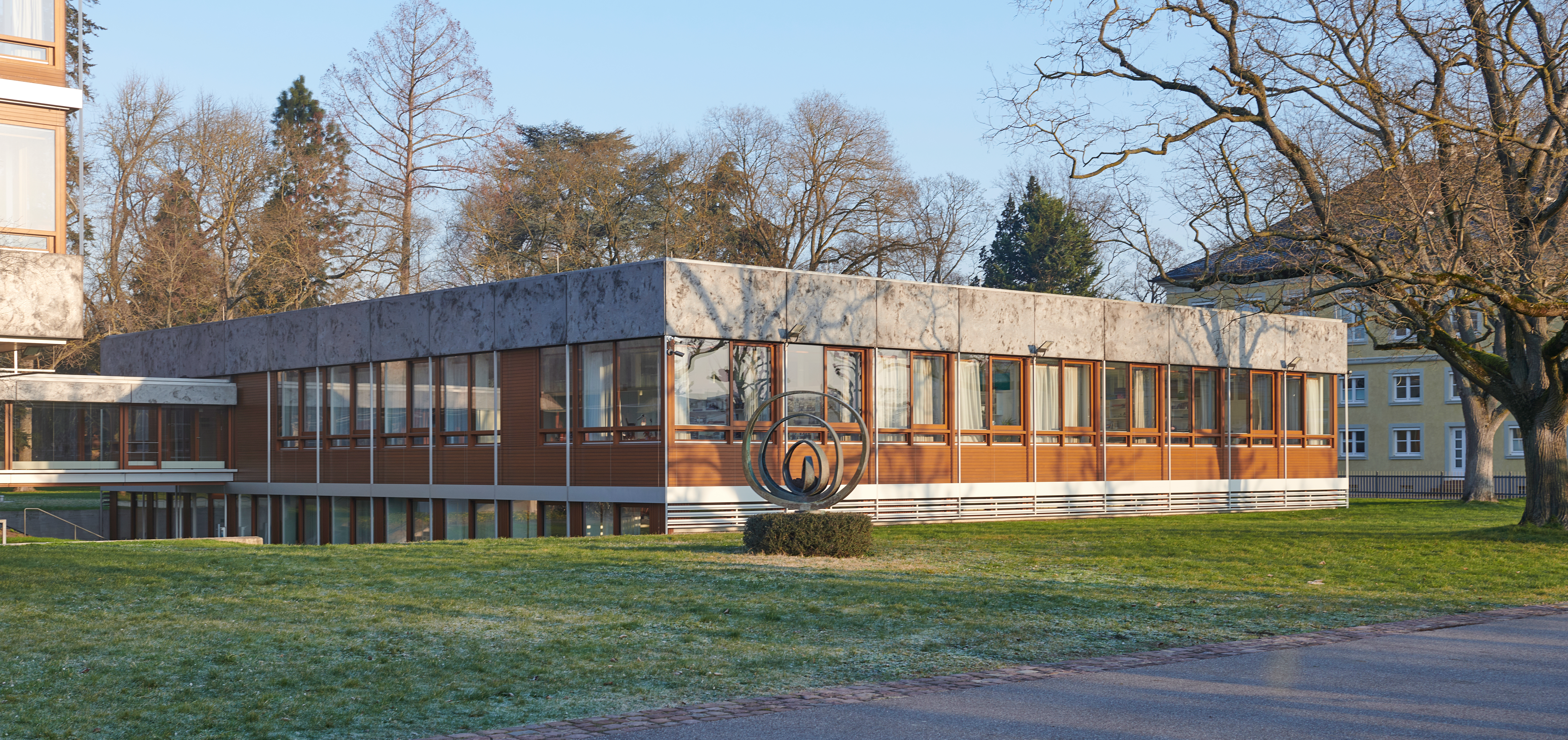
Component II

The building closest to the castle within the court complex is the administration building (Component V), which consists of one floor above ground. It accommodates the administrative staff, including the head, deputy head, and secretariat offices. Additionally, the administrative office is in this part of the building. Component V also houses administrative archives, chambers, sanitary facilities, and a duplication room. In 1992, this administrative pavilion was connected to the castle wing, used as a registry, via an underground corridor that is partially visible from the outside. Between the administrative building and the access road, one can find the sculpture Erkenntnis (Knowledge) created by Swiss artist André Bucher. This artwork consists of an unworked erratic block and bronze, with dimensions of 215 × 215 × 60 centimeters. Unveiled on 21 May 1982, the curved ellipse sculpture contains a lava rock from the Etna volcano at its center.

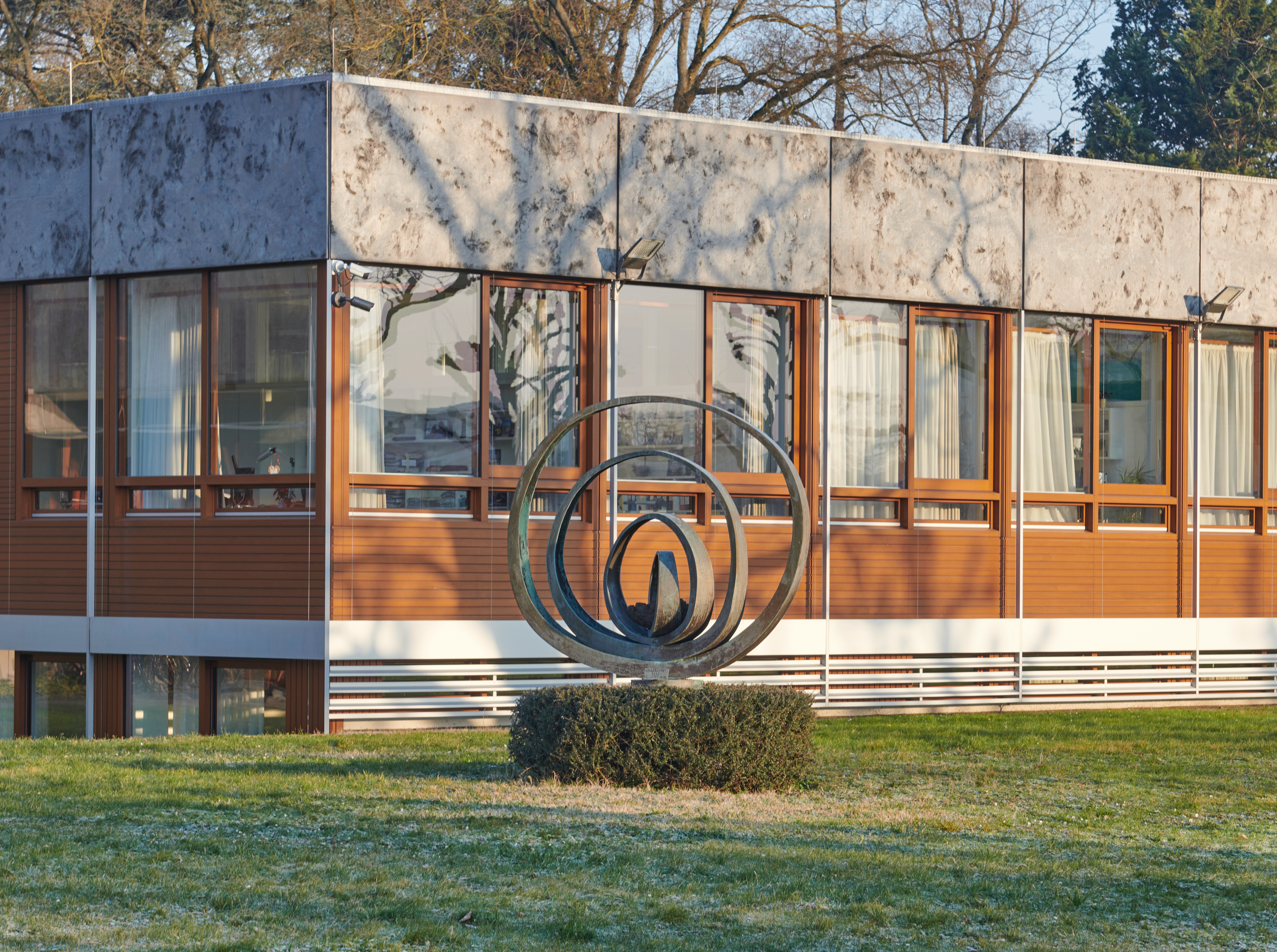
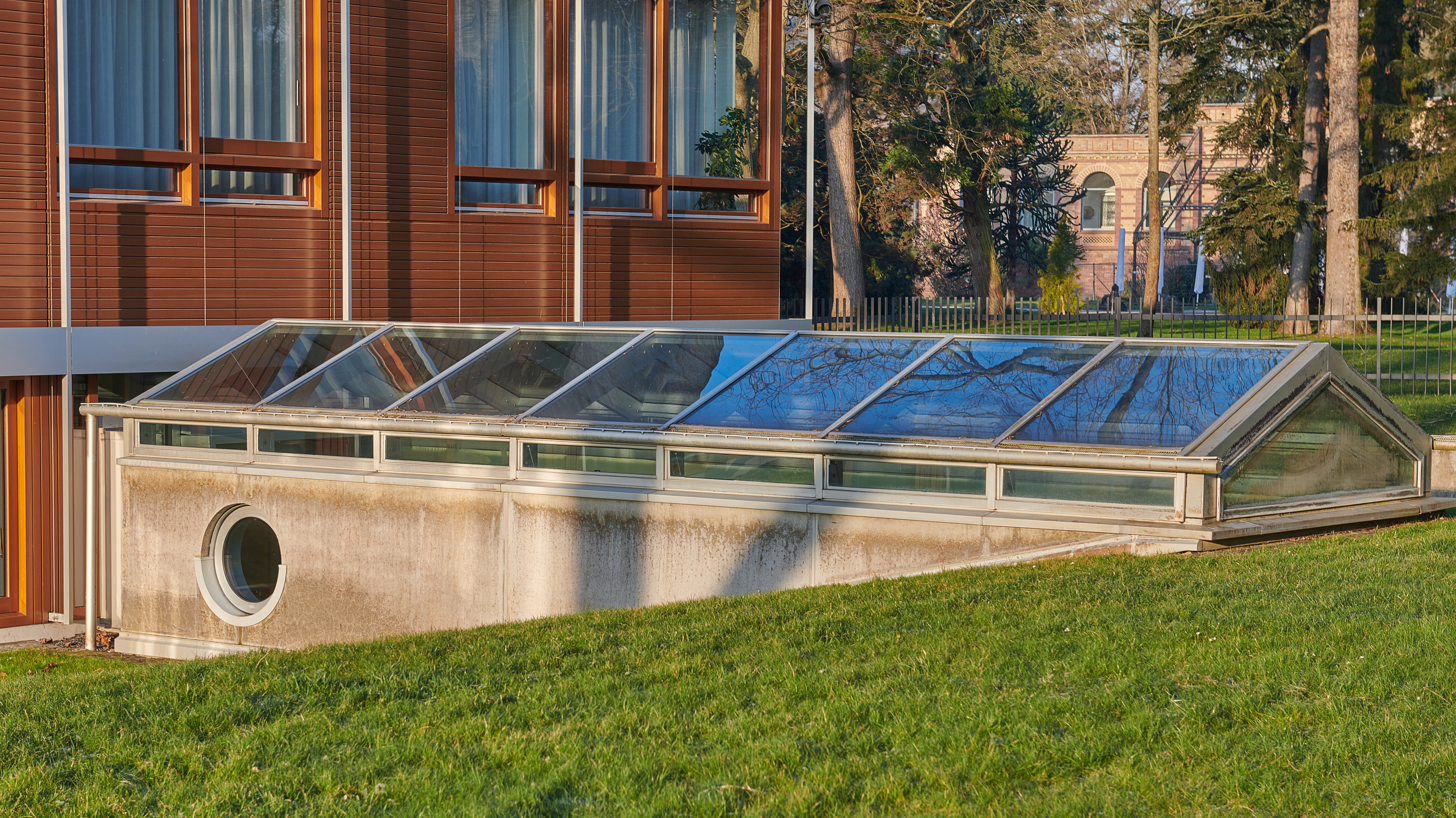
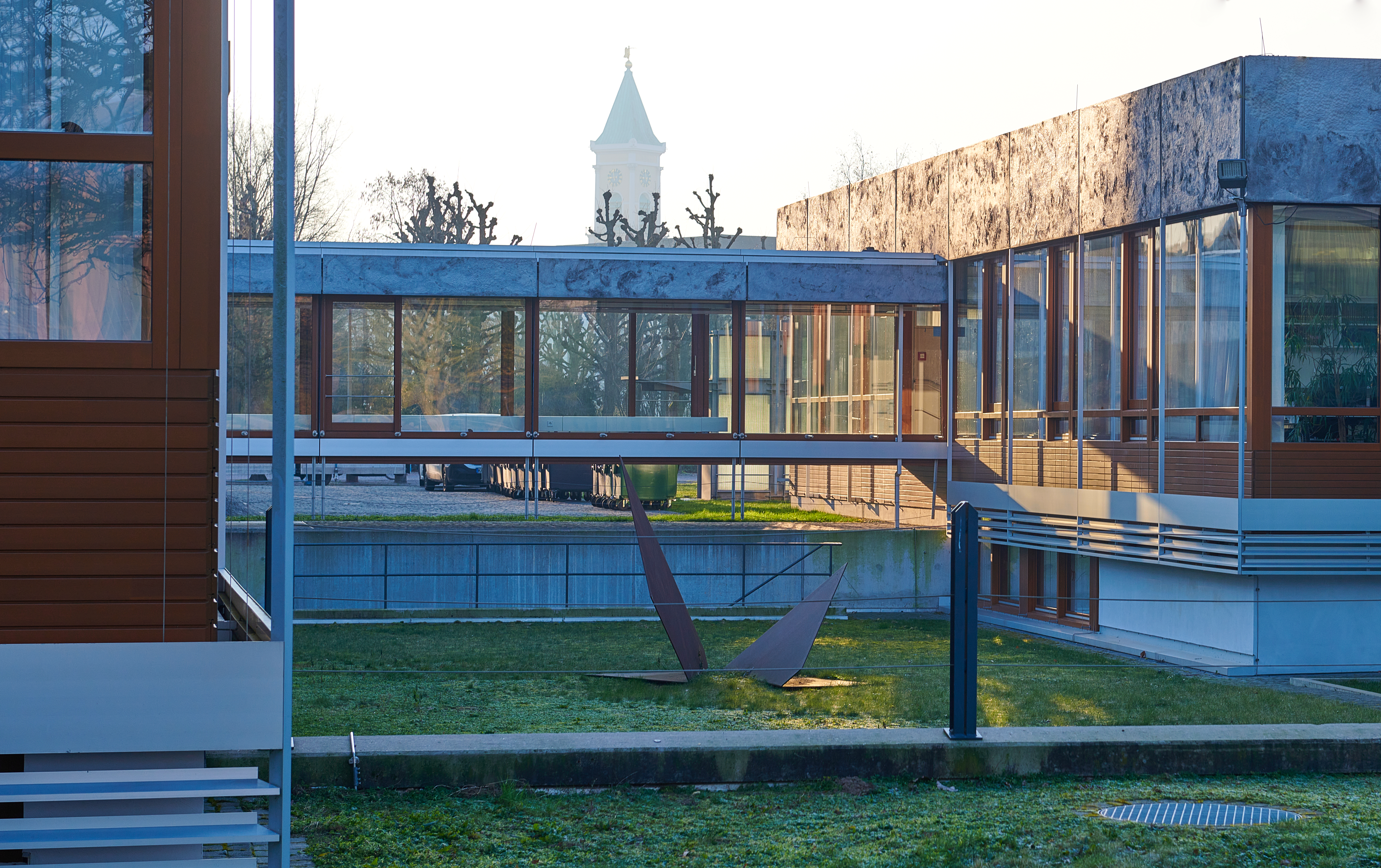
Detailed views (from left to right): Plastic Knowledge by André Bucher, connecting tunnel to the castle wing, part of the central connecting corridor (on the right, component I, in the background the Evangelical City Church )

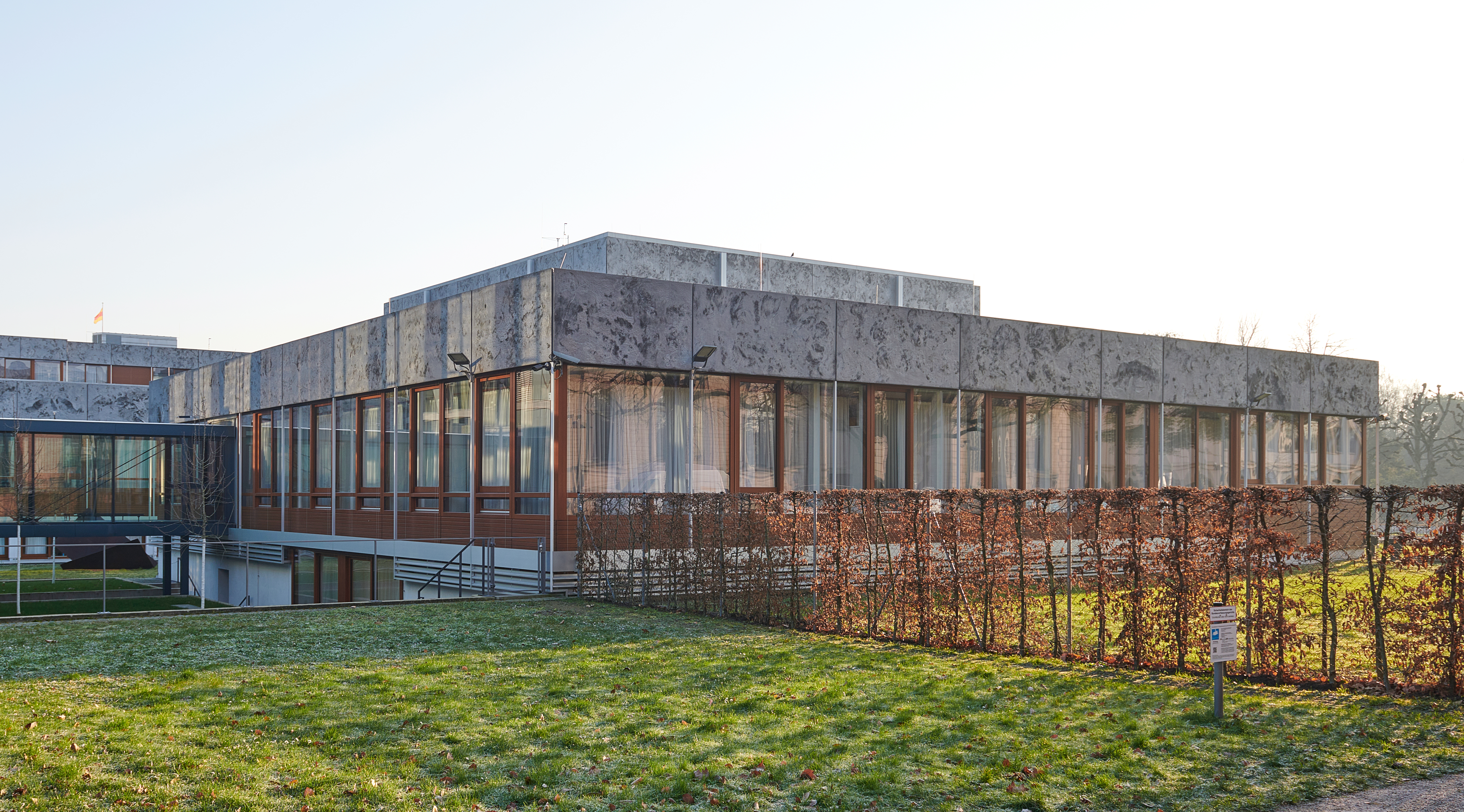
Component I

Opposite the meeting hall building, facing the Botanical Garden, one can find the library building (Component II). The central element of this building is the catalog room, housing the information desk, catalogs, circulation desk, and the book lift to the stacks, along with stairs and staff lifts. Surrounding the catalog room are two reading rooms and spaces for library staff. The first basement level, which has partial daylight due to site leveling, houses the press archive and signing room, a bindery and binding room, and 780 square meters of stacks and study space. The second basement level is used exclusively as a book stacks. The library's collection currently includes 400,000 volumes, growing by around 5,000 volumes each year. It also houses a substantial collection of periodicals, parliamentary and official publications of the federal and state governments, as well as 450 legal and social science periodicals from Germany and abroad. The primary construction of the column-free roof of the meeting hall building consists of sheet steel girders intersecting at the four quarter points, which are movably connected to eight pillars. Although these pillars do not absorb vertical forces, they are braced within the static system of the floor slabs.

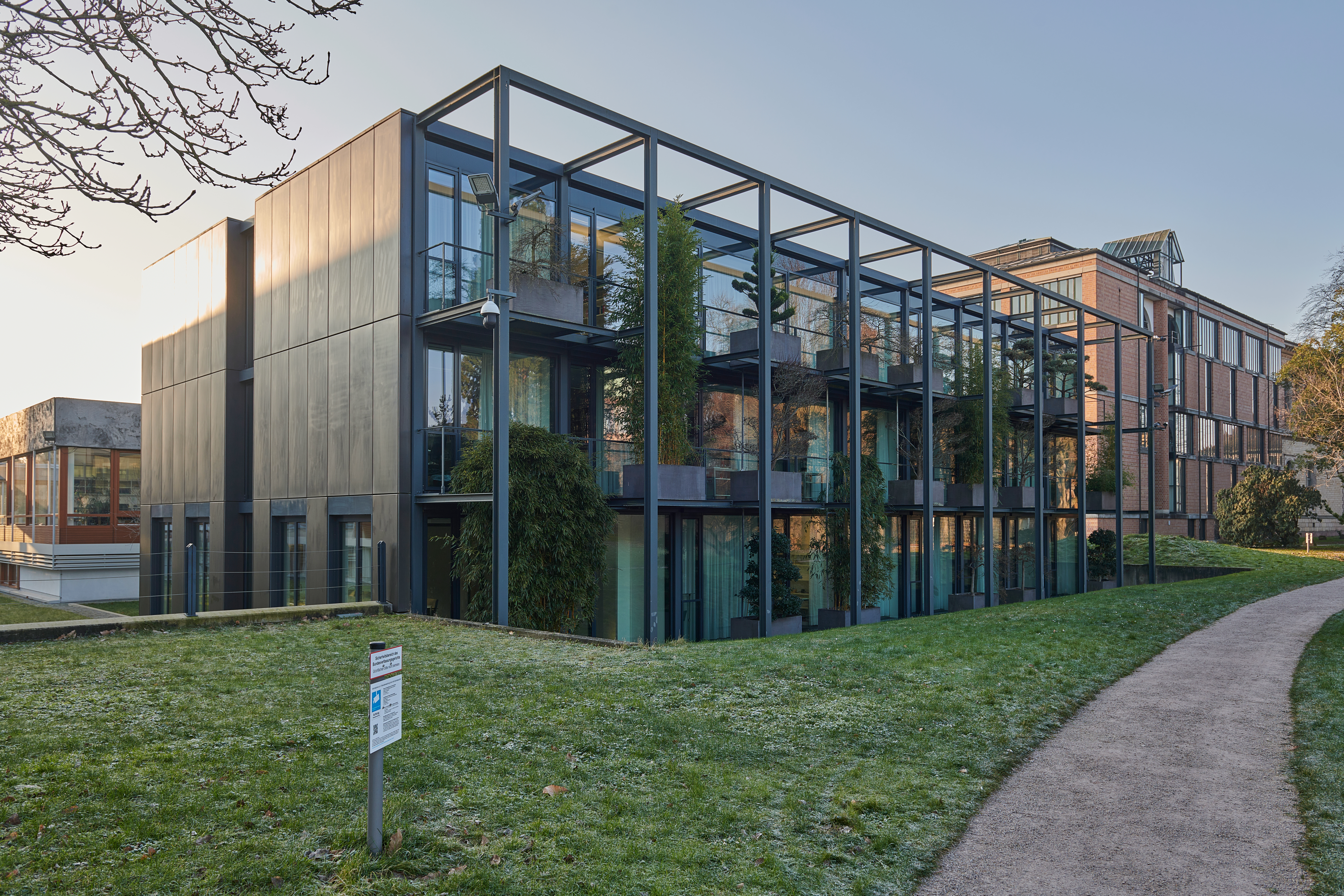
Component IX

The southern end of the building group, adjacent to the Kunsthalle, is occupied by the former casino building (Component I). Originally, this building served as a restaurant with a dining room facing the Botanical Garden. The kitchen facilities were at the core of the building. On the side facing the palace square, there was a restaurant special room, and service spaces. Additionally, the basement houses a technical center and an underground car park for 78 cars. Since 1995, the former casino building has been used for offices, a meeting room, and a break room.

The extension building (Component IX) designed by Schrölkamp, completed in March 2007, is located at the boundary with the Botanical Garden and aligns with the neighboring buildings. This new structure is connected to the other buildings via a bridge. The extension comprises 40 offices on two upper floors. The lowered ground floor contains the dining room and serving area, while the kitchen, technical rooms, and storage areas are in the basement. The design of the extension aims to harmonize the rational, cuboid building form with the natural surroundings. To achieve this, a pergola-like porch was added to the northwest façade, facing the orangery, to create a connection with the adjacent garden through plant growth. The scaffolding in front of the offices is adorned with dwarf pines, slash maple, hawthorns, and bamboo. The two front sides of the extension are clad with panels of burnished brass, thus contrasting in color with the rest of the building without standing out too much.

=== Art on the building ===
The interior of the Richter building features large-scale colorful paintings designed by the painter Franz Ackermann, who teaches at the Karlsruhe Art Academy. These paintings extend over several interior wall segments in the corridors and rooms. In 2013, Ackermann won an international competition for this project. His mural paintings use intense colors and incorporate a diverse pictorial language, which alternates between cartographic sign structures, representational elements, abstract color swirls, and ornamental passages. Ackermann's work is a significant artistic addition to the building.

In the stairwell of the extension building, the Karlsruhe artist Stefanie Lampert created a colored wall relief in 2008. This relief changes its appearance depending on the lighting conditions. Lampert employed rectangular color-field surfaces in yellow, grey, and green, creating an illusion of shifting perspectives on the walls and wall projections when illuminated from the southeast side.

One particularly symbolic sculpture on the premises is Die Gerechtigkeit (Justice) by the Swiss sculptor André Bucher. This metal sculpture, created in 1997, consists of four bent and interconnected iron rods that hold a ball in balance at the center. It stands on a block of marble. The sculpture, located in the former casino building, was featured on a postal stamp (Mi.-Nr. 2214) in 2001 to commemorate the 50th anniversary of the Federal Constitutional Court.

== Reception ==
=== Classification of the architectural style ===
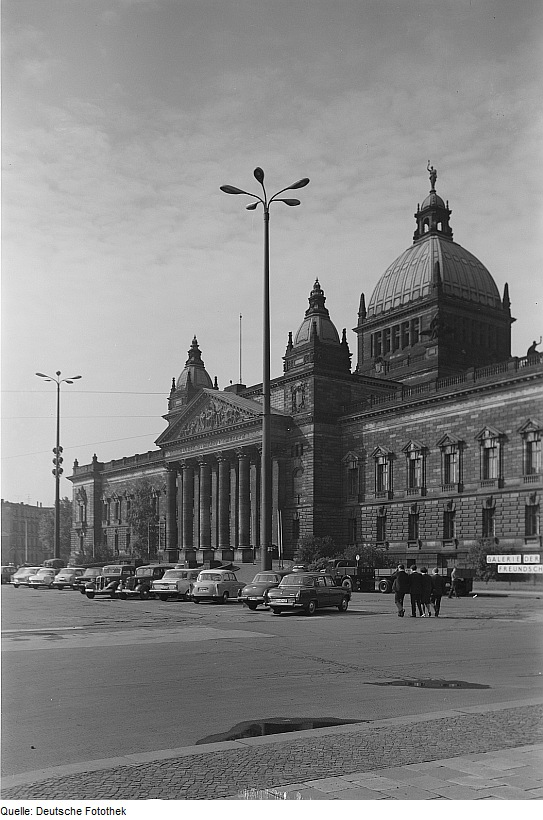
Example of monumental courthouse architecture in the case of the Reich Court Building in Leipzig (photo taken in 1965)

The sober-objective Baumgarten-bau of modernism, coming from the tradition of the Bauhaus, stands in the architectural field of tension between the baroque palace, the botanical garden, and the historicist art gallery. Rather than attempting to harmonize the evident disparities between these structures from different eras, the design aimed to foster a reflective dialogue with the existing surroundings. Several strategies were employed to achieve this. The flat budlings of the Federal Constitutional Court blend seamlessly into the park landscape, not only due to their modest height but also because of the restrained color palette in silver-grey, the use of glass, and the incorporation of brown wood tones. Notably, the design did not isolate the institution from its surroundings with walls or barriers but instead embraced transparency and openness. The Baumgarten-bau deliberately contrasts with the architecture in its immediate vicinity, as well as represents a deviation from the tradition of all Wilhelminian palaces of justice, the Wilhelminian era, and the architecture gigantomania of Nazi Germany. The architectural design of court buildings worldwide reflects the authoritative role of constitutional courts. These buildings are intended to inspire awe and convey power and law. As noted by architectural critic Heinrich Wefing, the Baumgarten-bau exemplifies a non-monumental court building. The construction of institutional buildings in the newly founded Federal Republic of Germany marked a new architectural beginning. This explains why the official buildings of the Bonn Republic adopted modernism, particularly the Bauhaus style. The design of the Chancellor's Bungalow, created by Sep Ruf at the request of former Federal Chancellor Ludwig Erhard for the purpose of highlighting the Republic's "cosmopolitan architectural spirit," is also included in this collection of structures.

Despite the intentional simplicity of the state building, the architects aimed for a representation that some contemporary critics questioned. Nevertheless, it incorporated unique elements, such as custom-made cast aluminum panels that deliberately contrasted with the simplicity of the 1950s. The façade featured what are known as corporeal surfaces, distinguished by their lintel and parapet elements, creating a visible contrast with the openness of the glass areas. While the individual buildings within the Federal Constitutional Court complex were similar, they were individually designed to fulfill their specific functions, defying a standardized and time-saving grid. On the other hand, the local media reported that the construction progress did not meet the expected pace. This was not least due to the architect Baumgarten himself, who sometimes struggled with every screw.

Andreas Voßkuhle, who served as the President of the Federal Constitutional Court from 2010 to 2020, emphasized the importance of the building's straight lines of sight and expansive window areas, stating, "The transparent, forward-facing structure is an integral part of our identity as a citizens' court."

In his inaugural lecture Demokratie als Bauherrin (Democracy as a builder) on January 25, 1994, jurist Ulrich Battis offered a critical perspective on the building's claim to transparency. While acknowledging the historical significance of state buildings like grand palaces of justice as expressions of judicial independence, Battis asserted that the institutional aspiration for complete transparency found limited realization in the Baumgarten building. It was a noble aspiration of the advocates of equality to build court structures that provide a comfortable environment for all participants in the proceedings, where they would sit together at a round table.

=== Awards ===
The renovation and modernization of the historic Baumgarten complex presented significant difficulty and complexity. Many architectural elements, characterized by their unique craftsmanship and industrial aesthetics, needed to be preserved. Preserving this feature while also meeting modern standards necessitated careful consideration and attention to detail.

The renovation and modernization project from 2009 to 2014 received several awards for building and architecture. The refurbishment of the courthouse received the following awards and nominations, among others:

- Exemplary Building Award 2018
- Hugo-Häring-Preis 2017
- Nomination for the category "Building for the Community" State Prize for Building Culture Baden-Württemberg 2016
- Deutscher Architekturpreis (Recognition) 2015
