= Schlossgarten =

Schlossgarten may refer to:

- Schlossgarten (Karlsruhe), a park in Karlsruhe
- Schlossgarten (Oldenburg), a park in Oldenburg
