= Schlossgarten (Karlsruhe) =

Park in Karlsruhe

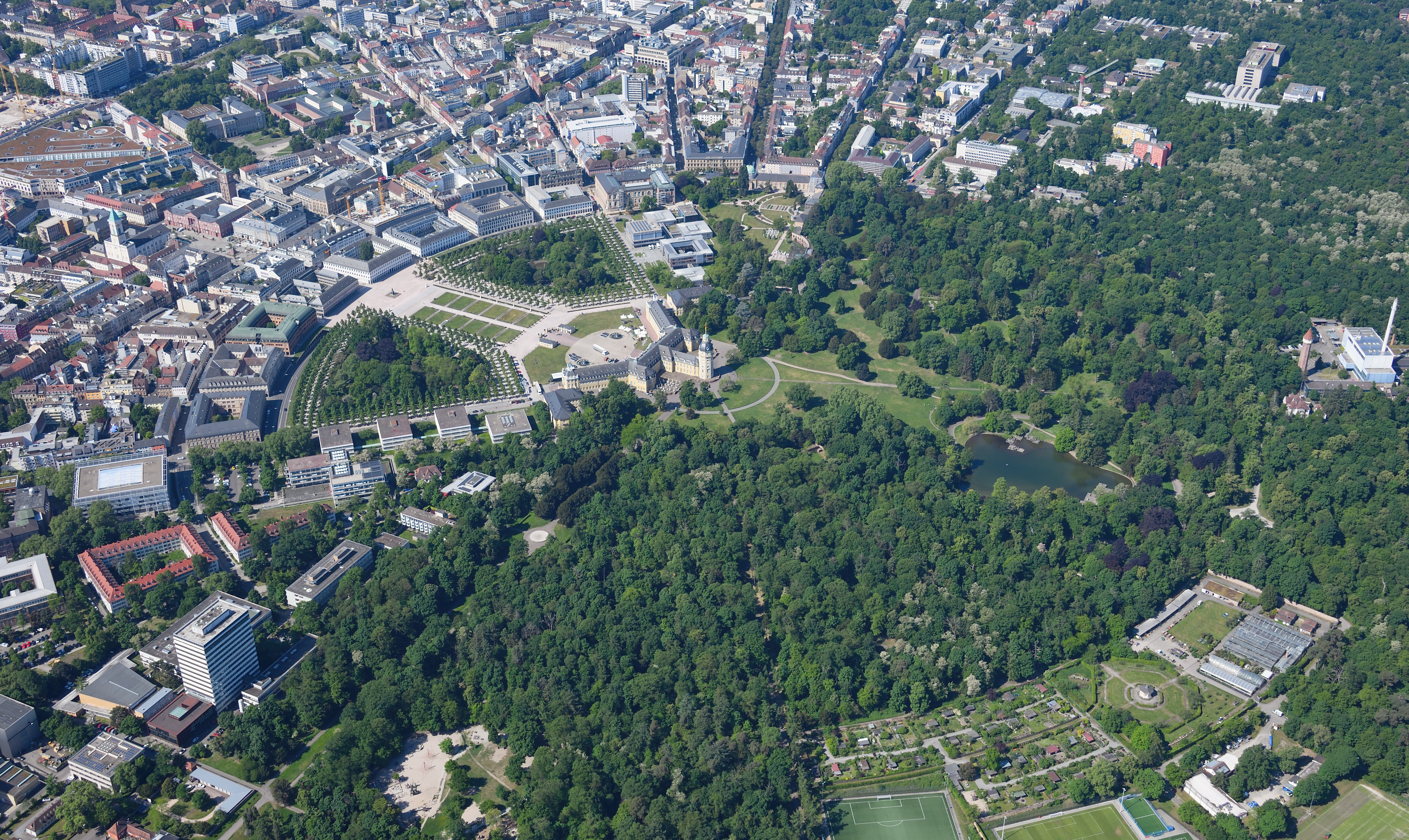
- Aerial view of the Schlossgarten, Karlsruhe palace and the city itself

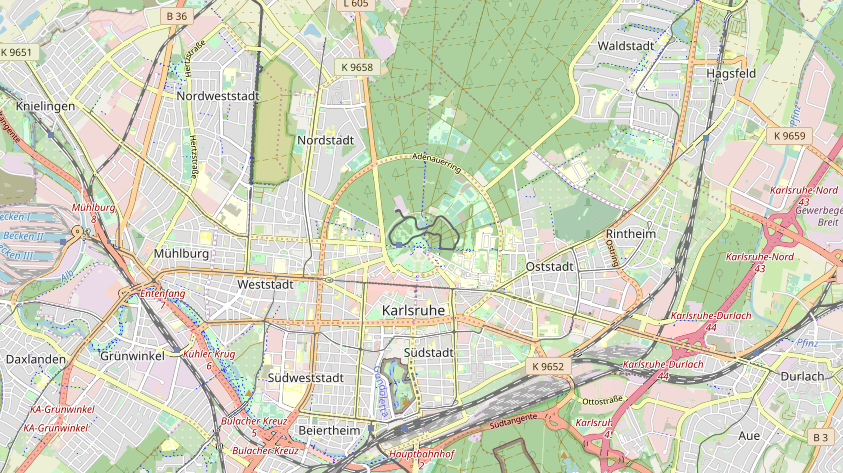
- Location within Karlsruhe Location within Baden-Württemberg
- Type: Palace garden
- Location: Karlsruhe, Germany
- Coordinates: 49°00′56″N 8°24′09″E
- Created: 1715
- Owner: State of Baden-Württemberg
- Status: Closing between 17:00 and 22:00 (depending on the season)
- Website: Official website

The Karlsruhe Schlossgarten (engl. palace garden), also called Schlosspark (engl. palace park), is a landscape park situated north of the Karlsruhe Palace in the center of Karlsruhe. It represents an extension of the palace grounds to the north, serves the people as a local holiday spot and is regularly used for events.

== Location ==
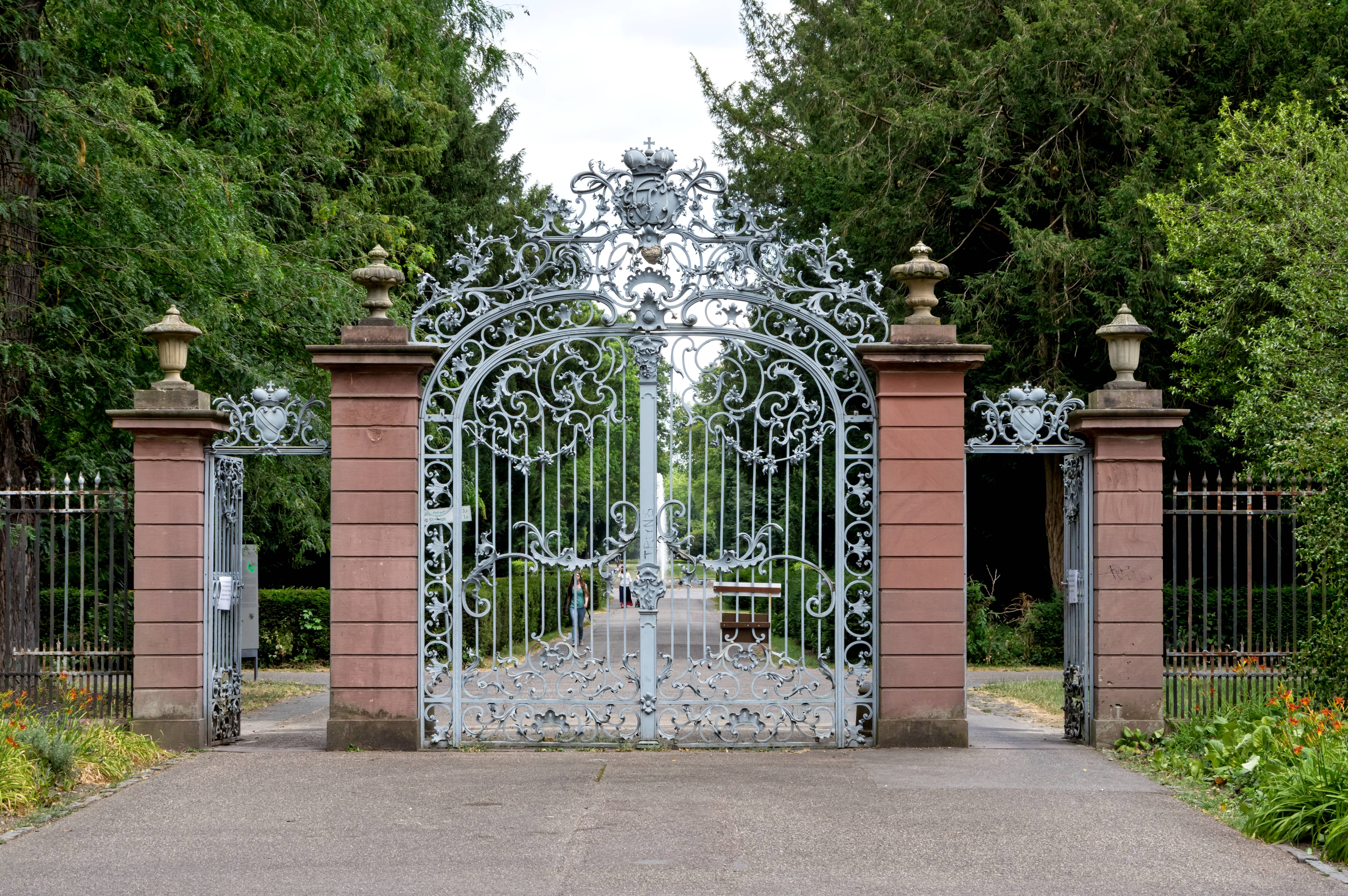
The Hirschtor on the east side of the park

The Schlossgarten lays in the center of the radial urban layout of the city on the north side of the palace on the former territory of the Hardtwald, which adjoins the garden to the north. The palace garden is part of the landscape conservation area Landschaftsschutzgebiet (LSG) Nördliche Hardt, which extends to the city limits and passes in the neighbouring district of Karlsruhe into the landscape conservation area Landschaftsschutzgebiet Hardtwald nördlich von Karlsruhe north of Karlsruhe. Thus, a 15-kilometer-long protected park and woodland area begins directly at Karlsruhe's city center, which is also designated as habitat Hardtwald zwischen Graben und Karlsruhe, a special area of conservation between Graben-Neudorf and Karlsruhe. Of these, about 500 m (546.8 yd) belong to the palace garden.

The irregular shape of the Schlossgarten is bordered by a stone wall. In the south, the garden borders the palace, in the southwest it borders the Botanischer Garten Karlsruhe. In the west and the north, the Schlossgarten owns a circular border to the Ahaweg. The eastern boundary runs straight in extension of the Friedrichstaler Allee and on the southern section it runs circular around the palace. The Fasanengarten and its own little castle are located to the east of the Schlossgarten.

The typical Karlsruhe shape which resembles a folding fan can only be partially found in the Schlossgarten. The Richard-Willstäter-Allee, the Blankenlocher Allee, the Blue Ray, as well as the Moltkestrasse (formerly called Mühlburger Allee) all lead as paths from the palace tower through the garden. Further paths begin outside of the garden. In direct vicinity of the palace garden you can find the Campus Süd of the Karlsruhe Institute of Technology and the German Federal Constitutional Court.

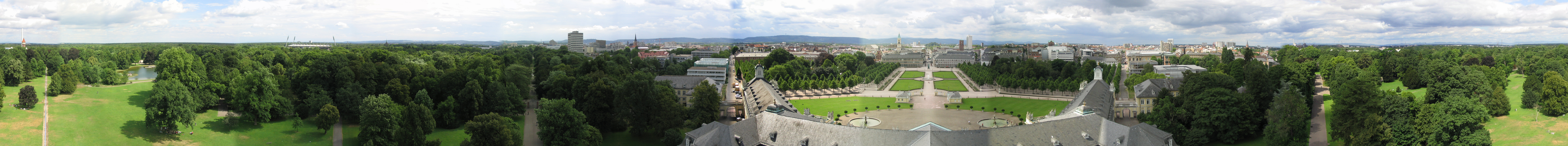
All-around view of the Schlossgarten from Karlsruhe Palace

== History ==
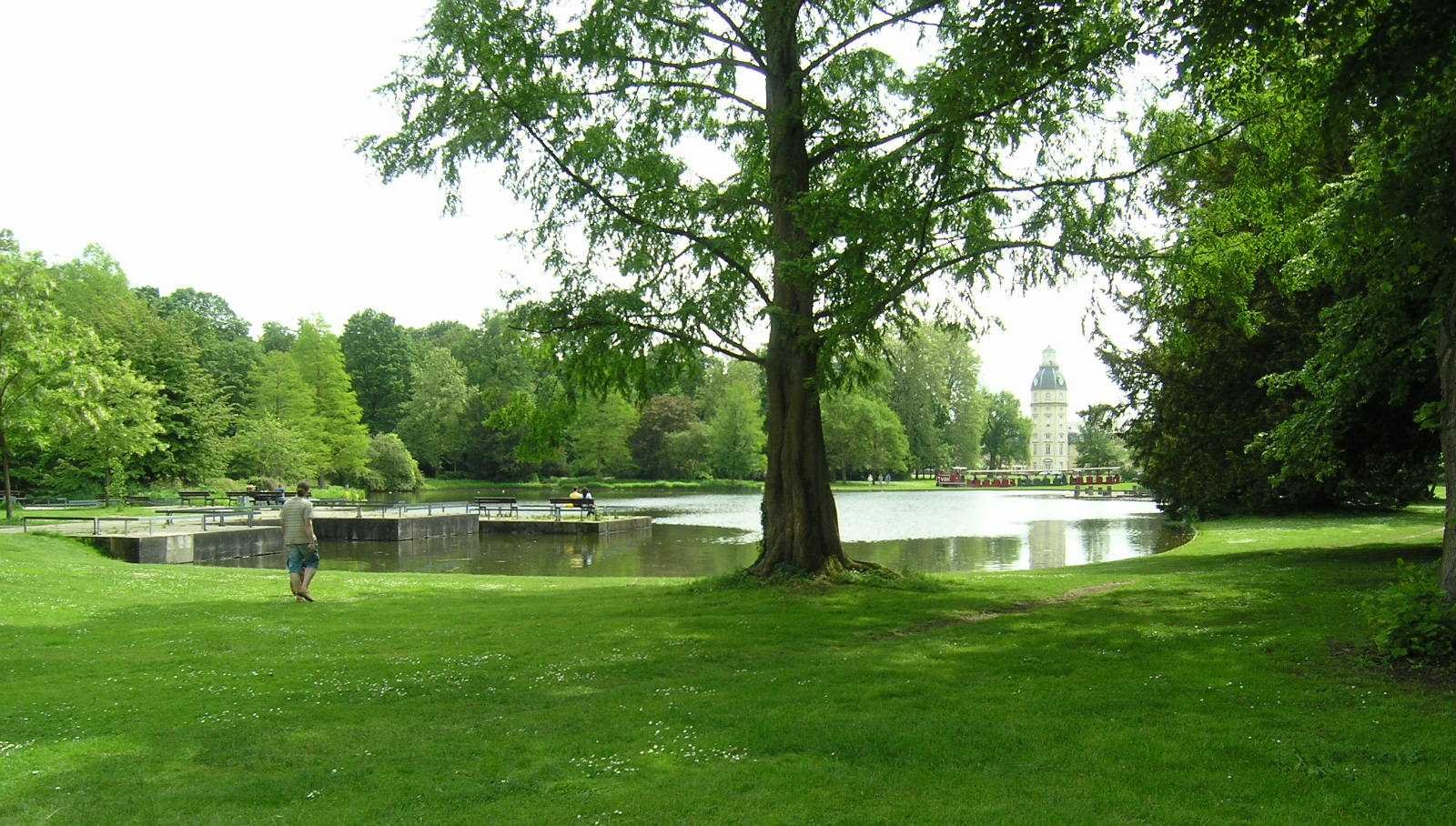
Schlossgartensee

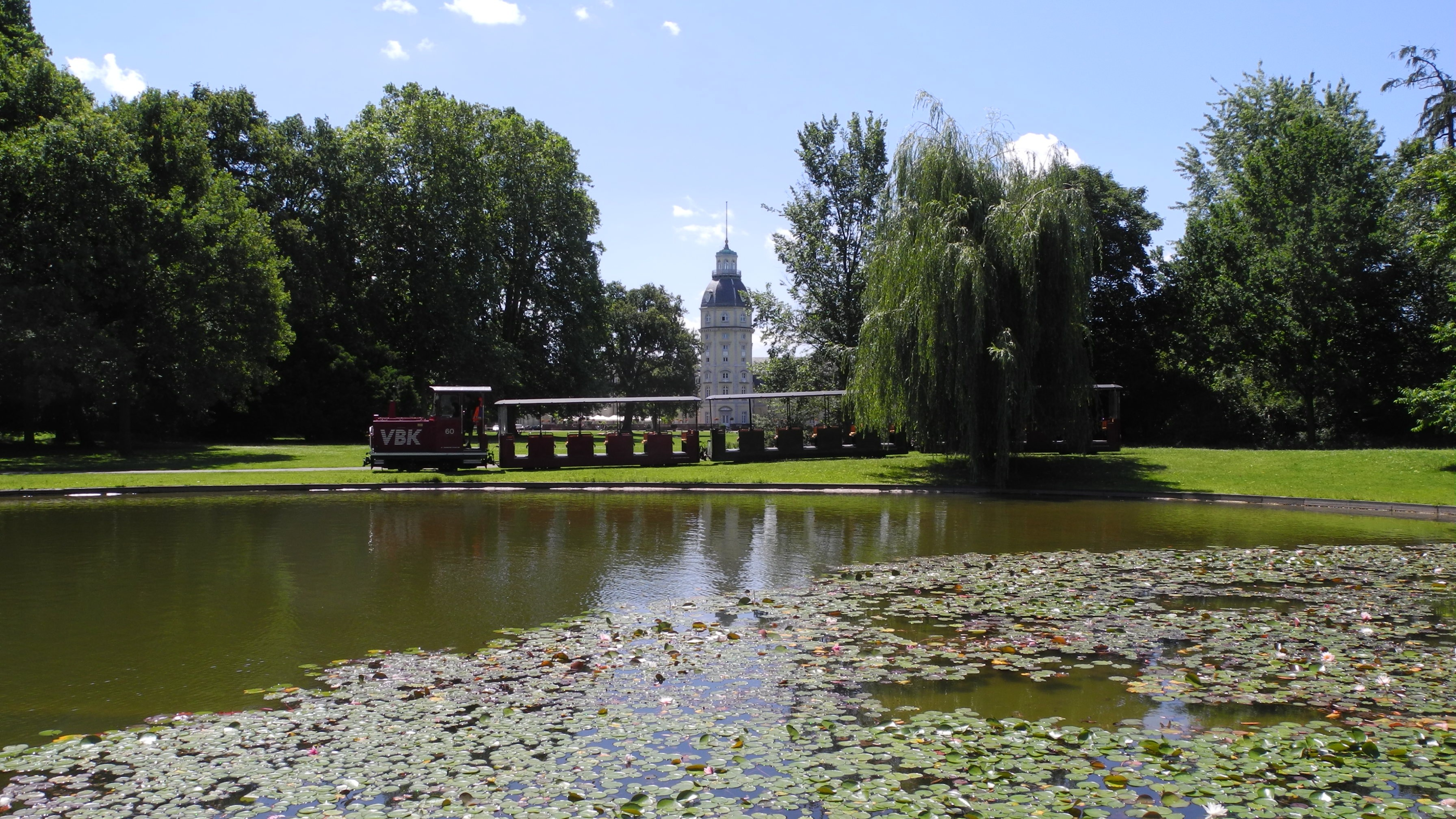
View of Karlsruhe Palace from the Schlossgarten with Schlossgartensee and Schlossgartenbahn

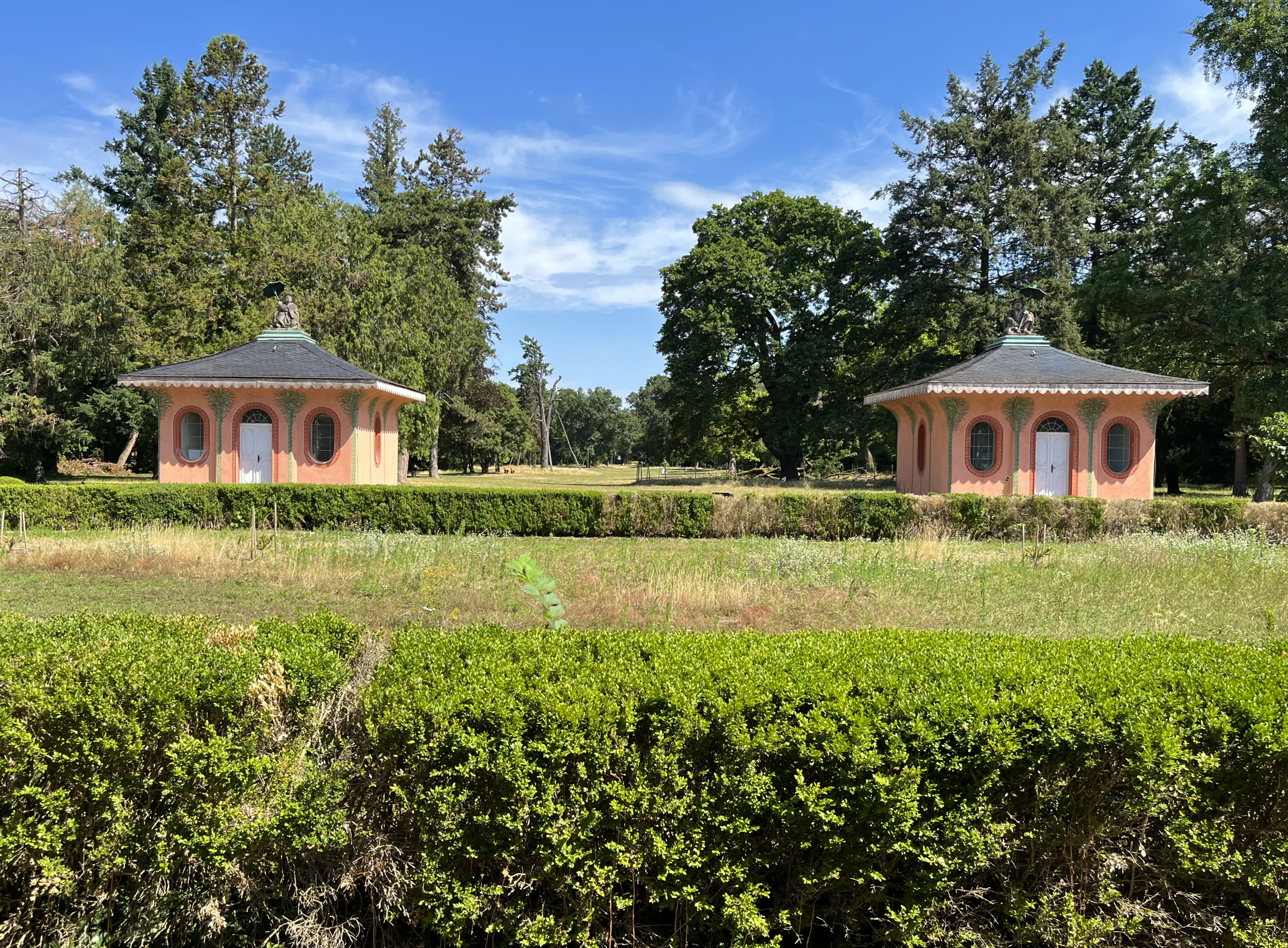
Chinese tea pavilions in the east part of the garden

The palace garden was laid out by Margrave Karl Wilhelm, who founded Karlsruhe in 1715. Initially, a baroque garden was laid out not behind but in front of the palace which was unusual for the 18th century. Exotic plants, especially tulips, were planted on today's palace square. From 1731 to 1746, court gardener Christian Thran laid out today's palace garden in French Baroque style behind the palace.

Karl Wilhelm's successor, his grandson Grand Duke Karl Friedrich, took over the government in 1746 and had areas of the garden redesigned by the court gardeners Johann Bernhard Saul and Philipp Ludwig Müller. Between 1767 and 1773, the western part was laid out as a Chinese garden with a garden house at its center. An artificial valley could be seen from a terrace and has been preserved along with a cave until today, as it now borders the orangery.

From 1787 on, Friedrich Schweickardt took over the transformation of the palace garden into an English landscape garden. In 1789, a court joinery was set up in the castle garden. At the end of the 18th century, the garden was temporarily open to the public, although some regulations had to be followed. On the promenades, for example, it was forbidden to smoke tobacco and to let pigs and geese roam freely.

From 1808 on, the botanical garden was created. In 1856, the court gardener Karl Mayer began to redesign the rear garden of the palace, and between 1864 and 1873, the palace garden lake was created. In 1884 the Weinbrenner-Tempel was moved from the Erbprinzengarten to the northwestern part of the Schlossgarten.

On the occasion of the Bundesgartenschau in 1967, the palace garden was renovated and further developed in the style of an English landscape park. The Schlossgartensee (engl. palace garden lake) was also redesigned and the Schlossgartenbahn (engl. palace garden railway) was put into operation. The original plan was to operate the railway only during the Bundesgartenschau, but it was not dismantled again afterward.

In 2001, a ribbon of 1645 blue majolica tiles was laid from the palace tower to the majolica manufactory on the north-western edge of the palace garden due to the 100th anniversary of the manufactory.

In 2015, many events took place in the palace garden as part of the 300th city anniversary. For this purpose, a wooden pavilion designed by Jürgen Mayer was erected as a temporary building among other things.

== Layout ==
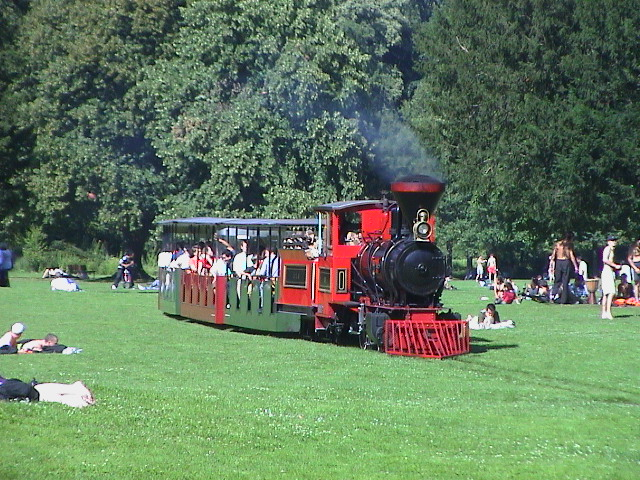
The Schlossgartenbahn

The large part of the palace garden is laid out as an English landscape garden. There are large meadows and numerous groups of trees, a lake and the 2.7 km (1.7 mi) long palace garden railway. The park is a cultural monument in accordance with the transitional regulation in § 28 of the Baden-Württemberg Law for the Protection of Monuments and Sites and accommodates further protected individual monuments:

- Johann Peter Hebel Monument (1835), bust of Fridolin Fechtig, neo-Gothic cast-iron architecture by Karl Joseph Berckmüller
- Hermann and Dorothea Sculpture Group (1833–1866) by Carl Johann Steinhäuser
- Säulenbrunnen (engl. column fountain)
- Weinbrenner-Tempel (engl. Weinbrenner Temple)
- Großherzog-Karl-Friedrich-Denkmal (engl. Grand Duke Karl Friedrich Monument)
- Seepferd-Brunnen (engl. Seahorse fountain)

The new design includes the Blue Ray, a band of blue majolica tiles between the castle tower and the majolica manufactory, and a bronze chair by Stefan Strumbel set up in 2015.

== Use ==
The palace garden is accessible as a recreational area and access to the lawns is permitted. With its size, central location and neat design, it regularly serves as a venue for events, some of them large and lasting several days:

- City anniversaries
- Opera performances
- Bierbörse (engl. beer festival)
- Medieval Fantasy Spectaculum

== See also ==
- Baumgarten-Bau

== Literature ==
- Schloss und Schlossgarten Karlsruhe. Staatliche Schlösser und Gärten. (2000), ISBN 978-3422030626
