= Heinz Fenrich =

German politician

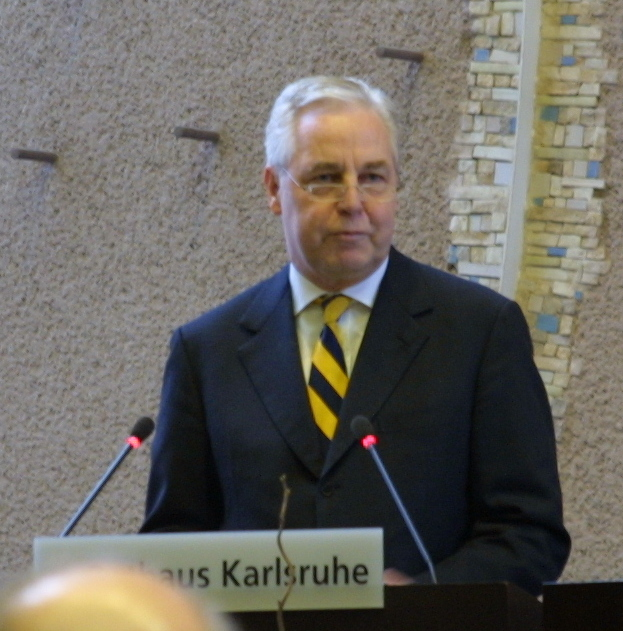
Heinz Fenrich, the mayor of Karlsruhe

Heinz Fenrich (born 9 February 1945, in Unteröwisheim, (today Kraichtal)) is a German Christian Democratic Union politician who most notably served as the lord mayor (Oberbürgermeister) of Karlsruhe from 1998 to 2013.

Fenrich received the Order of Merit of Baden-Württemberg in 2005 and the Order of Merit of the Federal Republic of Germany in 2013. He is an Honorary Citizen of Krasnodar.
