= Hardtwald =

Forest in Baden-Württemberg, Germany

Coordinates: 49.061°N 8.429°E

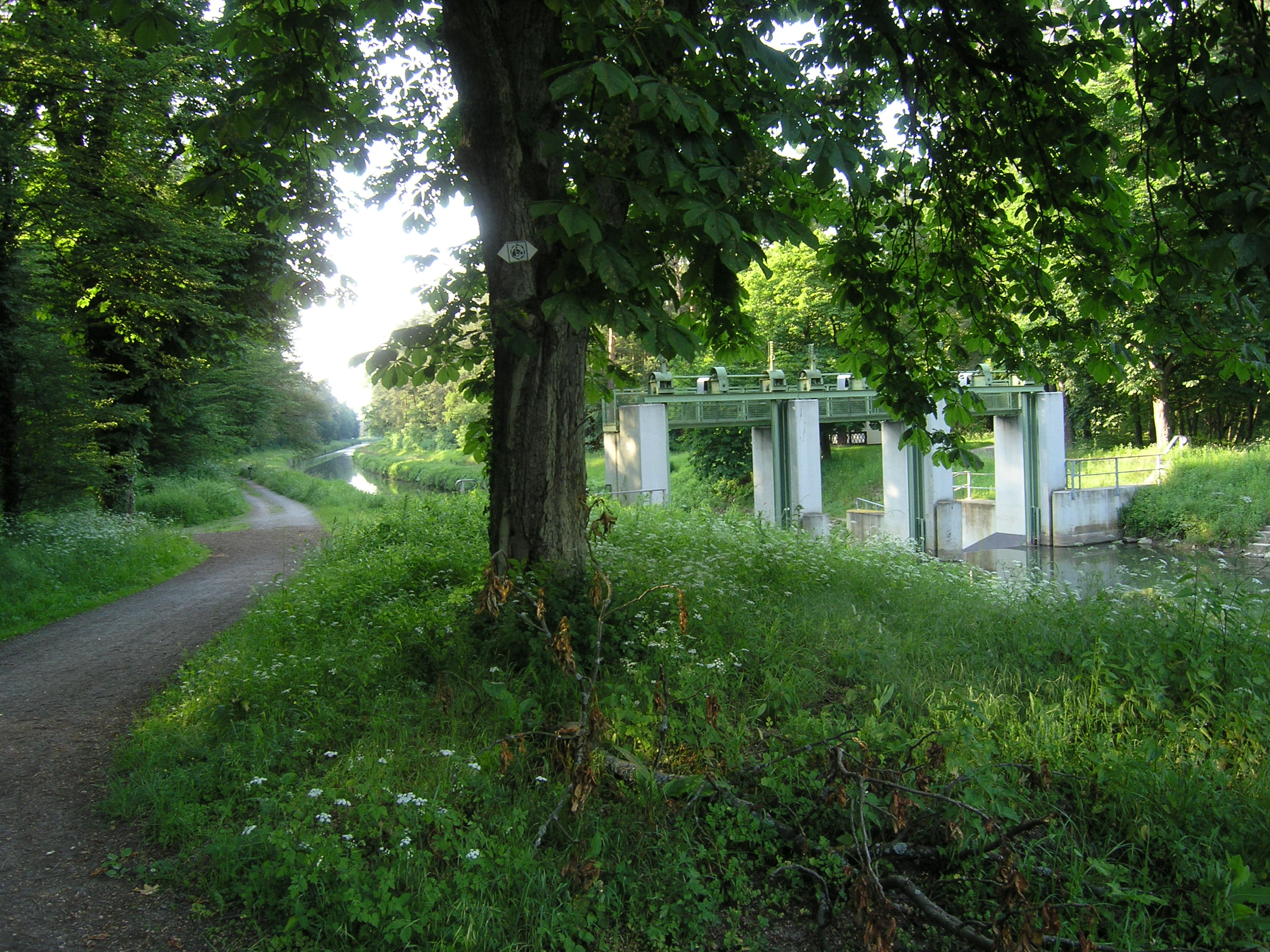
Drainage bypass canal for river Pfinz

The Hardtwald is a forest in Baden-Württemberg, south-western Germany. It is located around Karlsruhe, on the right (eastern) bank of the Rhine, between Schwetzingen in the north and Rastatt in the south. The Black Forest is located to its east. In the 18th century, Karlsruhe was founded in the Hardtwald.
